= Carmen Blanco =

Spanish feminist writer and activist

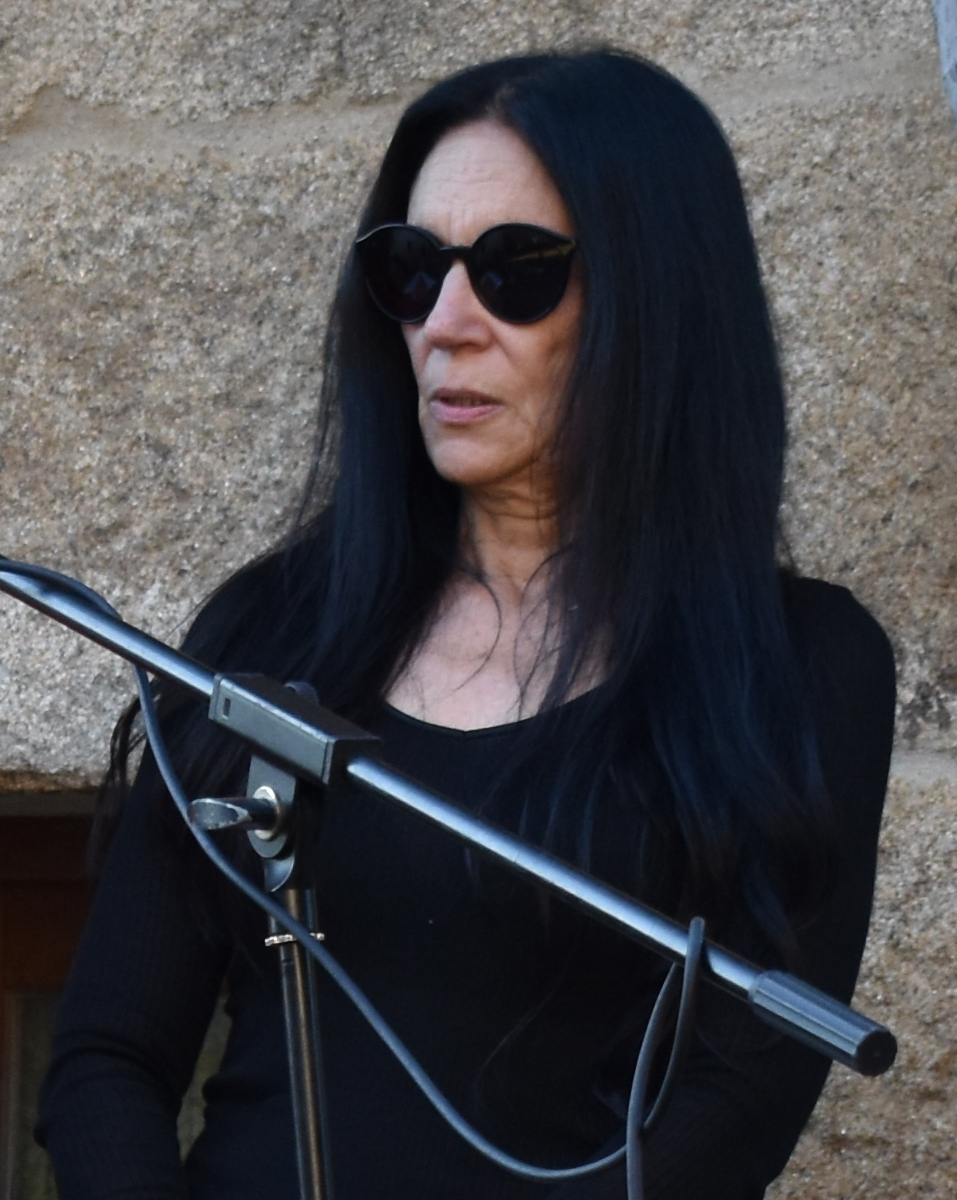
Carmen Blanco in 2022

Carmen Blanco (born 1954 in Lugo, Galicia, Spain) is a Spanish feminist writer and activist. She is Professor of Galician Literature at the University of Santiago de Compostela. With Claudio Rodriguez Fer she coordinates the intercultural and libertarian journal Unión Libre. Cadernos de vida e culturas and the Asociación para a Dignificación das Vítimas do Fascismo.

== Works ==
=== Essays ===
- Conversas con Carballo Calero (Vigo, Galaxia, 1989)
- Literatura galega da muller (Vigo, Xerais, 1991)
- Carballo Calero: política e cultura (Sada, Do Castro, 1991)
- Escritoras galegas (Santiago de Compostela, Compostela, 1992)
- Libros de mulleres (Vigo, Do Cumio, 1994)
- O contradiscurso das mulleres (Vigo, Nigra, 1995, El contradiscurso de las mujeres, Vigo, Nigra, 1997)
- Nais, damas, prostitutas e feirantas (Vigo, Xerais, 1995)
- Mulleres e independencia (Sada, Do Castro, 1995)
- Luz Pozo Garza: a ave do norte (Ourense, Linteo, 2002)
- Alba de mulleres (Vigo, Xerais, 2003)
- Sexo e lugar (Vigo, Xerais, 2006)
- María Mariño. Vida e obra (Vigo, Xerais, 2007)
- Casas anarquistas de mulleres libertarias (A Coruña-Santiago de Compostela, CNT, 2007)
- Uxío Novoneyra (Vigo, A Nosa Terra, 2009)
- Novoneyra: un cantor do Courel a Compostela. O poeta nos lugares dos seus libros (Noia, Toxosoutos, 2010)
- Feministas e libertarias (Santiago de Compostela, Meubook, 2010)
- Letras lilas (Lugo, Unión Libre, 2019)

=== Poetry ===
- Estraña estranxeira (A Coruña, Biblioteca Virtual Galega, 2004)
- Un mundo de mulleres (Biblos, 2011)
- Lobo amor (Unión Libre, 2011)

=== Prose ===
- Vermella con lobos (Vigo, Xerais, 2004)
- Atracción total (Vigo, Xerais, 2008)

=== Edition and introduction ===
- Xosé Luís Méndez Ferrín, Con pólvora y magnolias (Vigo, Xerais, 1989)
- Uxío Novoneyra, Os eidos (Vigo, Xerais, 1990)
- Ricardo Carvalho Calero, Uma voz na Galiza (Barcelona, Sotelo Blanco, 1992)
- Luz Pozo Garza, Códice Calixtino (Vigo, Xerais, 1992)
- Luz Pozo Garza, Historias fidelísimas (Ourense, Linteo, 2003)
- Luz Pozo Garza, Memoria solar (Ourense, Linteo, 2004)
- Extranjera en su patria. Cuatro poetas gallegos. Rosalía de Castro. Manuel Antonio. Luís Pimentel. Luz Pozo Garza (Barcelona, Círculo de Lectores / Galaxia Gutenberg, 2005)
- Día das Letras Galegas 2007. María Mariño Carou (Universidade de Santiago de Compostela, 2007)
