= Galician Literature Day =

Public holiday observed in Galicia, Spain

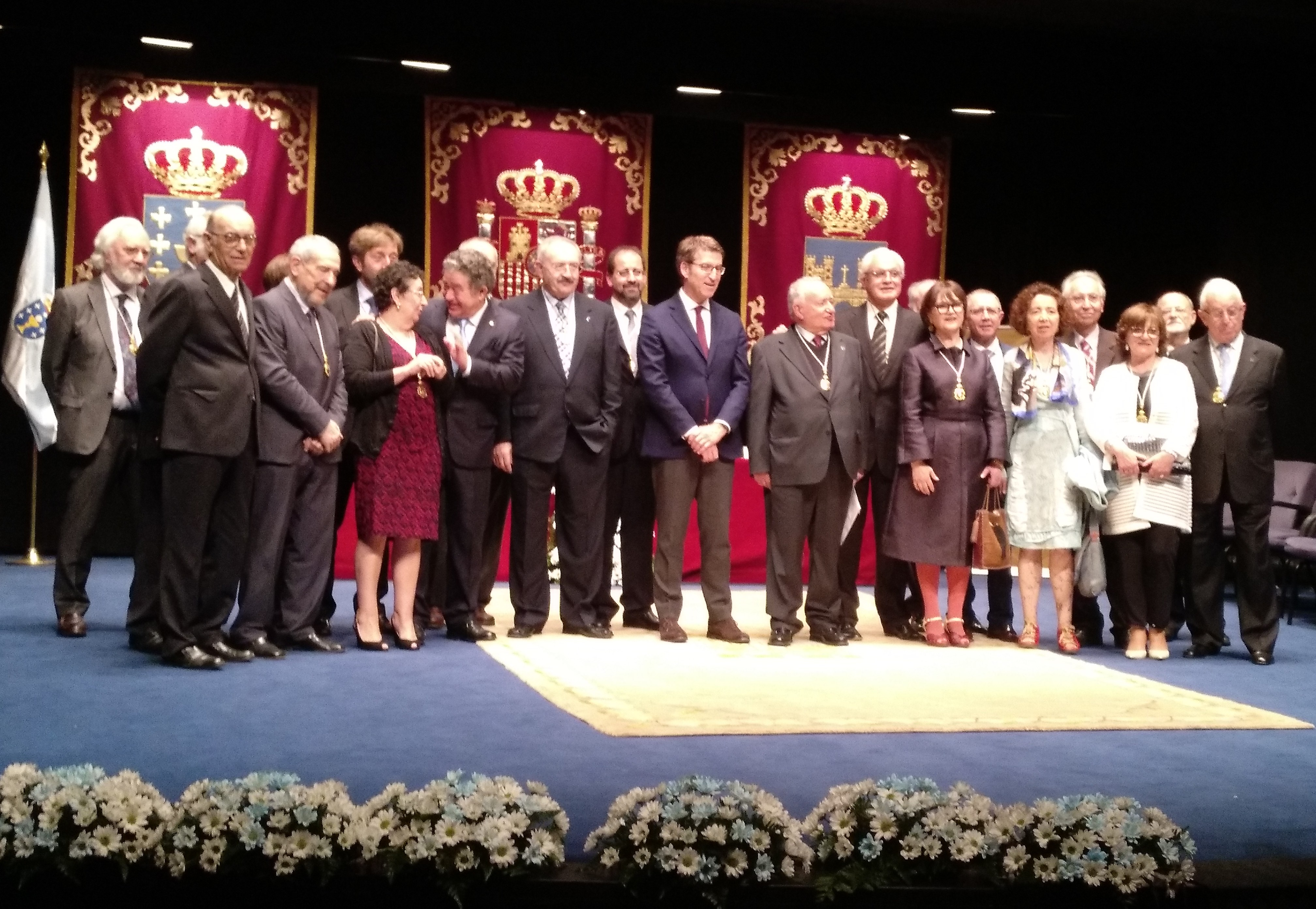
- In 2018
- Official name: Día das Letras Galegas
- Observed by: Galicia, Spain
- Type: Cultural
- Date: May 17
- Next time: May 17, 2026
- Frequency: annual

Galician Literature Day (Galician: Día das Letras Galegas) is a public holiday observed in Galicia, Spain. It is a celebration of the Galician language and its literature which was inaugurated by the Royal Galician Academy (Real Academia Galega) in 1963. This celebration has taken place on May 17 each year since 1963. In the year 1991 Galician Literature Day was declared a public holiday in all Galicia.

The first celebration took place in 1963 to commemorate the centenary of Cantares gallegos, the first contemporary work written in the Galician language by Rosalía de Castro (1837–1885), who later became one of the most important poets in the history of Galicia. Cantares gallegos was first published on May 17, 1863.

Since 1963, each Galician Literature Day has been dedicated to a different writer in the Galician language. Only writers who have been dead for at least ten years are eligible, and the choice is made by the Royal Galician Academy. There is only one precedent of a "shared" Day: in 1998, the day was dedicated to Martín Codax, Xohán de Cangas and Mendinho, together with the authors of the medieval songs (cantigas).

== History ==
On the 20th of March 1963, three members of the Royal Galician Academy (Manuel Gómez Román, Xesús Ferro Couselo e Francisco Fernández del Riego) presented this institution with the proposal to celebrate the 17th of May to gather the “material heartbeat of the Galician intellectual activity”. They estimated that the book of poems by Rosalía de Castro (Cantares Gallegos) was the first masterpiece of contemporary Galician literature, and therefore the inaugurator of the literary movement known as O Rexurdimento. The real date of publication of Cantares Gallegos is actually unknown, but this day was chosen due to the written dedication from Rosalía to the Galician writer Cecilia Böhl de Faber (Fernán Caballero).

To commemorate the first Galician Literature Day, a critical edition of Cantares Gallegos was published by famous writer Fermín Bouza-Brey. The festivity had an extraordinary reach and significance, and it was well received not only among the literary elite, but also among the general public. From this day, this festivity is celebrated every year and it is dedicated to a significant figure of Galician literature. The sole condition is that on the year of the year of their commemoration, a minimum of ten years must have passed since the death of the honoured person.

Officially, it has been a public holiday in Galicia since 1991.

In 2020, due to the COVID-19 pandemic, the Academy announced that for the first time in its 57-year history, the celebration would not take place on May 17, moving instead to October 31, just one day after the 110th birthday of the honouree, Ricardo Carvalho Calero. Finally, health restrictions meant that the act had to be postponed again, until December 12.

== List of authors honoured on Galician Literature Day ==
These are the authors who have been honored on Galician Literature Day:

- 1963 Rosalía de Castro
- 1964 Alfonso Daniel Rodríguez Castelao
- 1965 Eduardo Pondal
- 1966 Francisco Añón Paz
- 1967 Manuel Curros Enríquez
- 1968 Florentino López Cuevillas
- 1969 Antonio Noriega Varela
- 1970 Marcial Valladares Núñez
- 1971 Gonzalo López Abente
- 1972 Valentín Lamas Carvajal
- 1973 Manuel Lago González
- 1974 Johán Vicente Viqueira
- 1975 Xoán Manuel Pintos Villar
- 1976 Ramón Cabanillas
- 1977 Antón Vilar Ponte
- 1978 Antonio López Ferreiro
- 1979 Manuel Antonio
- 1980 Afonso X o Sabio
- 1981 Vicente Risco
- 1982 Luís Amado Carballo
- 1983 Manuel Leiras Pulpeiro
- 1984 Armando Cotarelo Valledor
- 1985 Antón Lousada Diéguez
- 1986 Aquilino Iglesia Alvariño
- 1987 Francisca Herrera Garrido
- 1988 Ramón Otero Pedrayo
- 1989 Celso Emilio Ferreiro
- 1990 Luís Pimentel
- 1991 Álvaro Cunqueiro
- 1992 Fermín Bouza-Brey
- 1993 Eduardo Blanco Amor
- 1994 Luis Seoane
- 1995 Rafael Dieste
- 1996 Xesús Ferro Couselo
- 1997 Ánxel Fole
- 1998 Martín Codax, Xohán de Cangas and Mendinho;
  together with the authors of the medieval songs (cantigas)
- 1999 Roberto Blanco Torres
- 2000 Manuel Murguía
- 2001 Eladio Rodríguez
- 2002 Frei Martín Sarmiento
- 2003 Antón Avilés de Taramancos
- 2004 Xaquín Lorenzo
- 2005 Lorenzo Varela
- 2006 Manuel Lugrís Freire
- 2007 María Mariño Carou
- 2008 Xosé María Álvarez Blázquez
- 2009 Ramón Piñeiro López
- 2010 Uxío Novoneyra
- 2011 Lois Pereiro
- 2012 Valentín Paz-Andrade
- 2013 Roberto Vidal Bolaño
- 2014 Xosé María Díaz Castro
- 2015 Xosé Filgueira Valverde
- 2016 Manuel María
- 2017 Carlos Casares
- 2018 María Victoria Moreno
- 2019 Antón Fraguas
- 2020 Ricardo Carballo Calero
- 2021 Xela Arias
- 2022 Florencio Delgado
- 2023 Francisco Fernández del Riego
- 2024 Luisa Villalta
- 2025 Pandeireteiras de Mens

- 2026 Begoña Caamaño
