= María Victoria Moreno =

Spanish writer and teacher

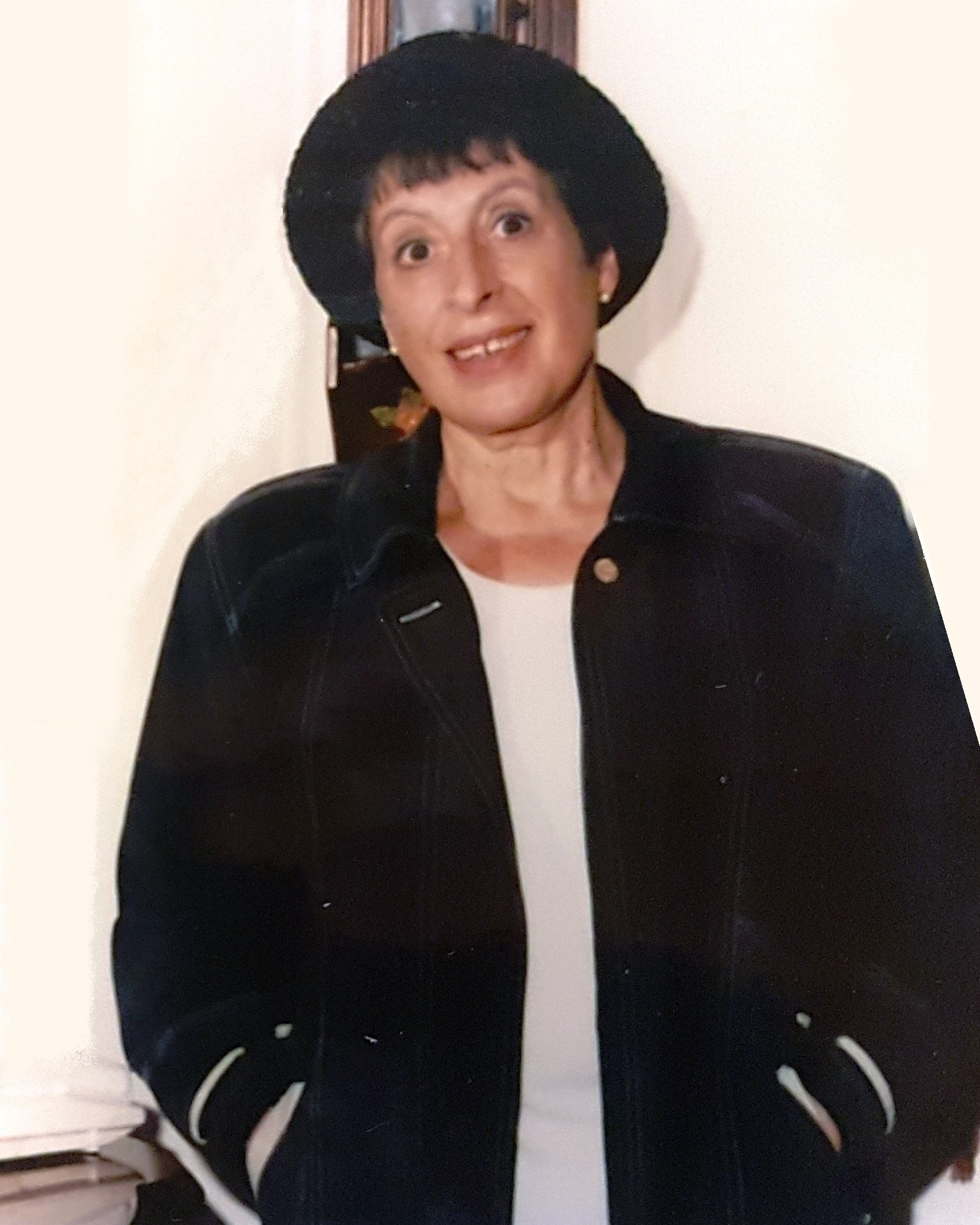
- Born: María Victoria Moreno Márquez; 1 May 1939; Valencia de Alcántara, Extremadura, Spain
- Died: 22 November 2005 (aged 66); Pontevedra, Galicia, Spain
- Education: Universidad de Madrid
- Occupations: teacher and writer
- Writing career
- Language: Galician, Spanish

María Victoria Moreno Márquez (1 May 1939 – 22 November 2005) was a Spanish writer and teacher. She was one of the pioneers of literature for children and young people in Galician. The Day of Galician Literature was devoted to her on 17 May 2018.

== Life ==
Born in a town bordering Portugal, she was the daughter of a lawyer and a teacher, studied in Barcelona and graduated in Romance Studies from the University of Madrid, where she was taught by Rafael Lapesa and Dámaso Alonso. After spending two years in Lugo and some time in Vilalonga (Sanxenxo), where she began to write Anagnórise, she arrived in Pontevedra in 1963 as a teacher (later a professor) and taught at the IES Valle-Inclán and the IES Gonzalo Torrente Ballester.

She actively participated in the cultural and political life of Pontevedra. Her fascination from a very young age with Galicia and its language led to an absolute commitment to the defence and promotion of Galician.

== Works ==
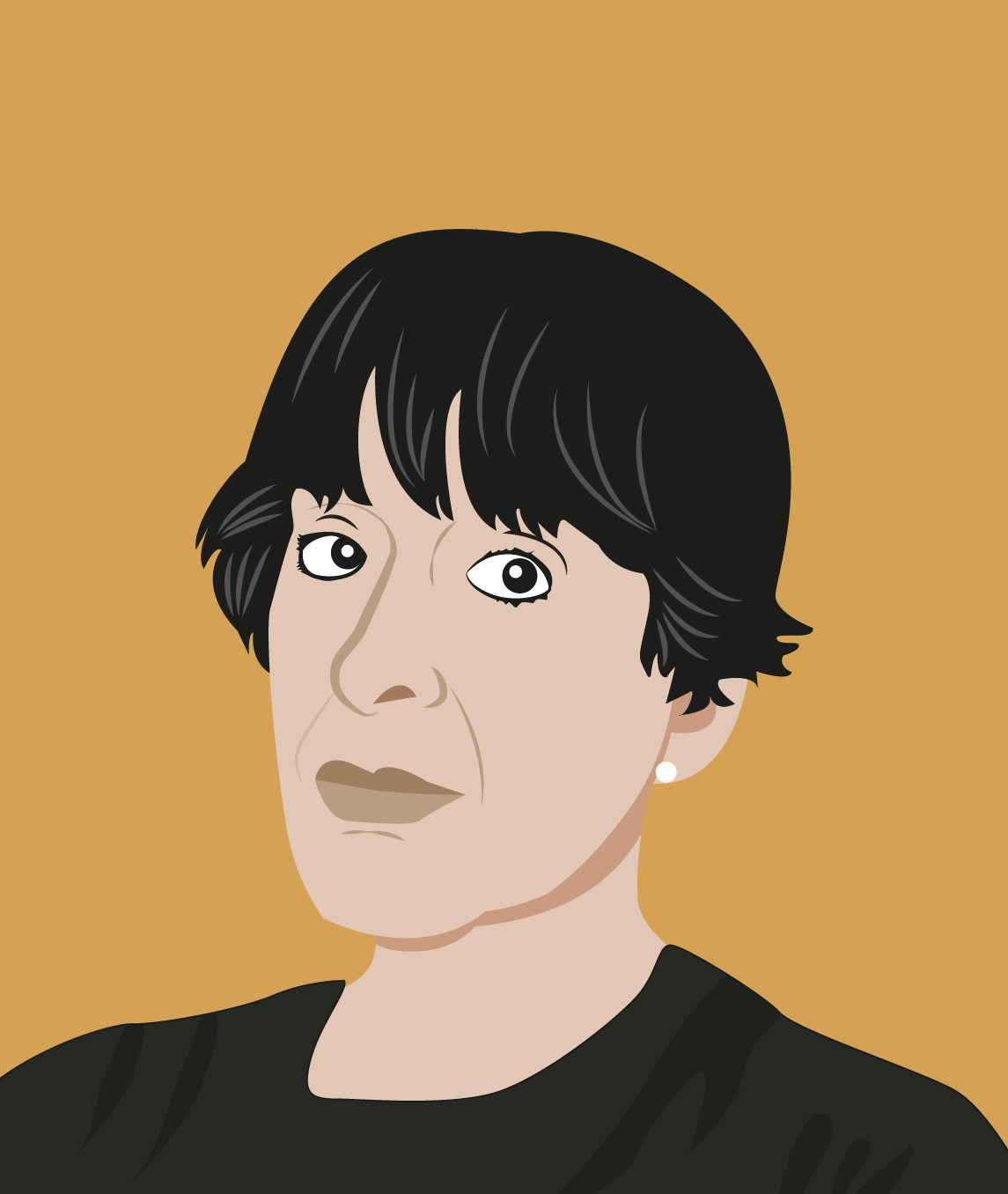

=== In Galician ===
Children's literature

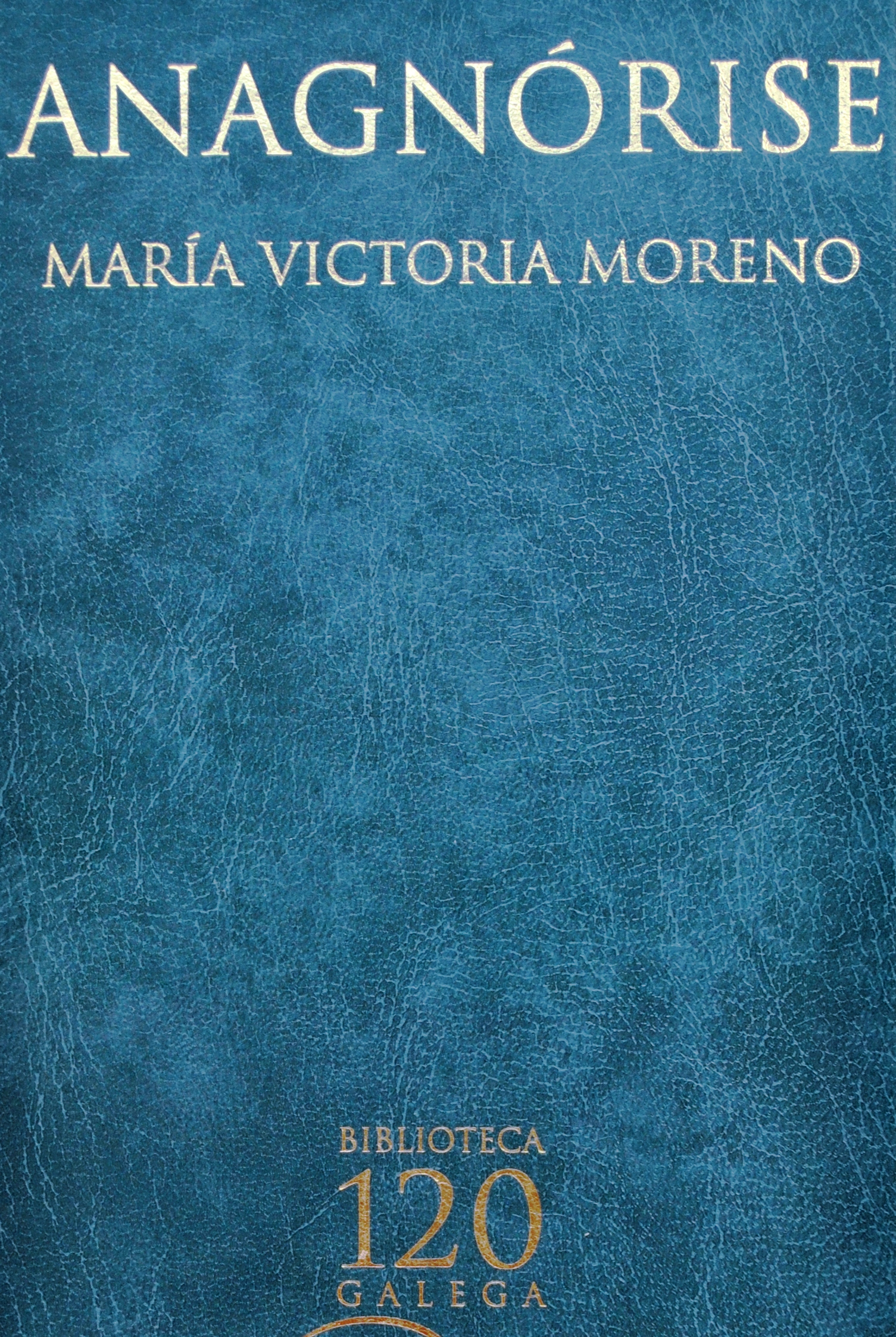
Anagnórise, Biblioteca Galega 120.

- Mar adiante, Sada, Ediciós do Castro, 1973.
- A festa no faiado, Vigo, Galaxia, 1983.
- A brétema, Vigo, Galaxia, 1985.
- Leonardo e os fontaneiros, Vigo, Galaxia-SM, 1986. 3º Barco de Vapor Award.
- Anagnórise, Vigo, Galaxia, 1988. Also in Biblioteca Galega 120.
- O cataventos, Santiago de Compostela, Sotelo Blanco Edicións, 1989.
- ¿Un cachiño de bica?, Vigo, SM, 1994.
- ¿E haberá tirón de orellas?, Vigo, Galaxia, 1997.
- Guedellas de seda e liño, Vigo, Galaxia, 1999.
- Eu conto, ti cantas, Vigo, Edicións Xerais de Galicia, 2005.
- O amor e as palabras, Urco Editora, 2017.

Essays

- As linguas de España, Santiago, Colección Andel n.º 9, Xunta de Galicia, 1991.
- Verso e prosa, Santiago, Colección Andel n.º 15, Xunta de Galicia, 1991.
- Diario da luz e a sombra, Vigo, Xerais, 2004.

Narrative

- Querida avoa, Vigo, Contos do Castromil, 1992.

Poems

- Elexías de luz, Vigo, Xerais, 2006.

Translations

- Mecanoscrito da segunda orixe (Mecanoscrit del segon origen, 1974), Manuel de Pedrolo, Vigo, Galaxia, 1989.

Collective works

- "O cataventos", in Contos pra nenos, Vigo, Galaxia, 1979.
- "Comentarios de texto: descubrir a realidade", in Xornadas da Lingua Galega no Ensino, Santiago, Xunta, 1984.
- Literatura século XX. Iniciación universitaria, Vigo, Galaxia/SM, 1985. With Xesús Rábade Paredes.
- "Nico e Miños", in 8 contos, Santiago de Compostela, Xunta de Galicia, 1989.
- "Querida avoa", in Lerias, Santiago de Compostela, Xunta de Galicia, 1991.
- "S.O.S.", in Contos de hogano, Santiago de Compostela, El Correo Gallego, 1992.
- "O libro das saudades e os degoiros", in Ruta Rosalía 1993, Caixa Galicia. Santiago de Compostela, 1993.
- "Pan con chocolate", in Relatos para un tempo novo, Santiago de Compostela, Xunta de Galicia, 1993.
- "Discurso pronunciado por Xesús Alonso Montero no acto no que recibiu o Pedrón de Ouro", in Comentarios de textos populares e de masas, Vigo, Xerais, 1994.
- "¿Escritora alófona eu?", in Poetas alófonos en lingua galega, Vigo, Galaxia, 1994.
- E dixo o corvo..., Santiago de Compostela, Xunta de Galicia, 1997.
- "¡Xa non-teño medo!", in A maxia das palabras, Santiago de Compostela, Xunta de Galicia, 1998–1999.
- "Amigos de mil cores", in Campaña de Lectura 2001, Santiago de Compostela, Xunta de Galicia, 2001.
- "Carta de amor", in Carlos Casares: a semente aquecida da palabra, Santiago de Compostela, Consello da Cultura Galega, 2003.
- "O encontro", in Un libro, a maior aventura, Santiago de Compostela, Xunta de Galicia, 2003.
- "O grumete", in Contos de charlatáns, grumetes, botas e fendas, Santiago de Compostela, Xunta de Galicia, 2004.

In magazines

- "Estou a escribir a contrarreloxo". Interview with Xosé A. Neira Cruz, Fadamorgana. Santiago de Compostela, nº 3 (December 1999).

=== In Spanish ===
External images
- Photograph 1 (passport)
- Photograph 2
- Photograph 3 (c) Gonzalo Salgado

Editions

- Os novísimos da poesía galega / Los novísimos de la poesía gallega (bilingual edition), Madrid, Ediciones Akal, 1973.

In magazines

- "M.V.M., una profesora feliz de serlo". CLIJ: cuadernos de literatura infantil y juvenil (Barcelona) (41): 48–50. 1992.

Novel

- Alcores de Donalvar. 1969. In Galician: Onde o aire non era brisa, Galaxia, 2009.

Translations

- El perro Rin y el lobo Crispín, 1986 (Carlos Casares).

== Bibliography ==
- "Moreno Márquez, María Victoria". Dicionario biográfico de Galicia 3. Ir Indo Edicións. 2010–2011. p. 7.
- "Moreno Márquez, María Victoria". Diciopedia do século 21 2. Do Cumio, Galaxia & do Castro. 2006. pp. 1411–1412. ISBN 978-84-8288-942-9.
- "Moreno Márquez, María Victoria". Gran Enciclopedia Galega Silverio Cañada (DVD). El Progreso. 2005. ISBN 84-87804-88-8.
- Blanco García, Carmen (1991). Literatura galega da muller. Edicións Xerais de Galicia. ISBN 84-7507-560-6.
- Casalderrey, F.; Aleixandre, M. (2918). María Victoria Moreno: a muller que durmía pouco e soñaba moito . Vigo: Xerais.
- Fernández del Riego, F. (1990). Diccionario de escritores en lingua galega. Sada: Ediciós do Castro. p. 288.
- Fernández Paz, Agustín (1989). 28 libros da literatura infantil e xuvenil galega. Xunta de Galicia. ISBN 84-453-0049-0.
- Ríos, Eli (2016). Mulleres bravas da nosa historia. María Victoria Moreno. Urco Editora. pp. 36 (s/n). ISBN 978-84-16121-632. CC BY-NC-ND
- Soto, I (1999). "Á beleza polo lirismo e a tenrura. Achegamento á obra de María Victoria Moreno". Fadamorgana. Revista galega de literatura infantil e xuvenil (3): 17–21.
- ———— (1998). "Dous estremeños na literatura galega: Mª Victoria Moreno e Xosé Antonio Perozo”". IIº Congreso de Literatura Infantil e Xuvenil “Historia Crítica de la Literatura y la Ilustración Ibéricas. Cáceres.
- Vilavedra, Dolores, ed. (1995). Diccionario da Literatura Galega I. Galaxia. p. 395. ISBN 84-8288-019-5.
