= Uxío Novoneyra =

Galician poet, writer, and journalist

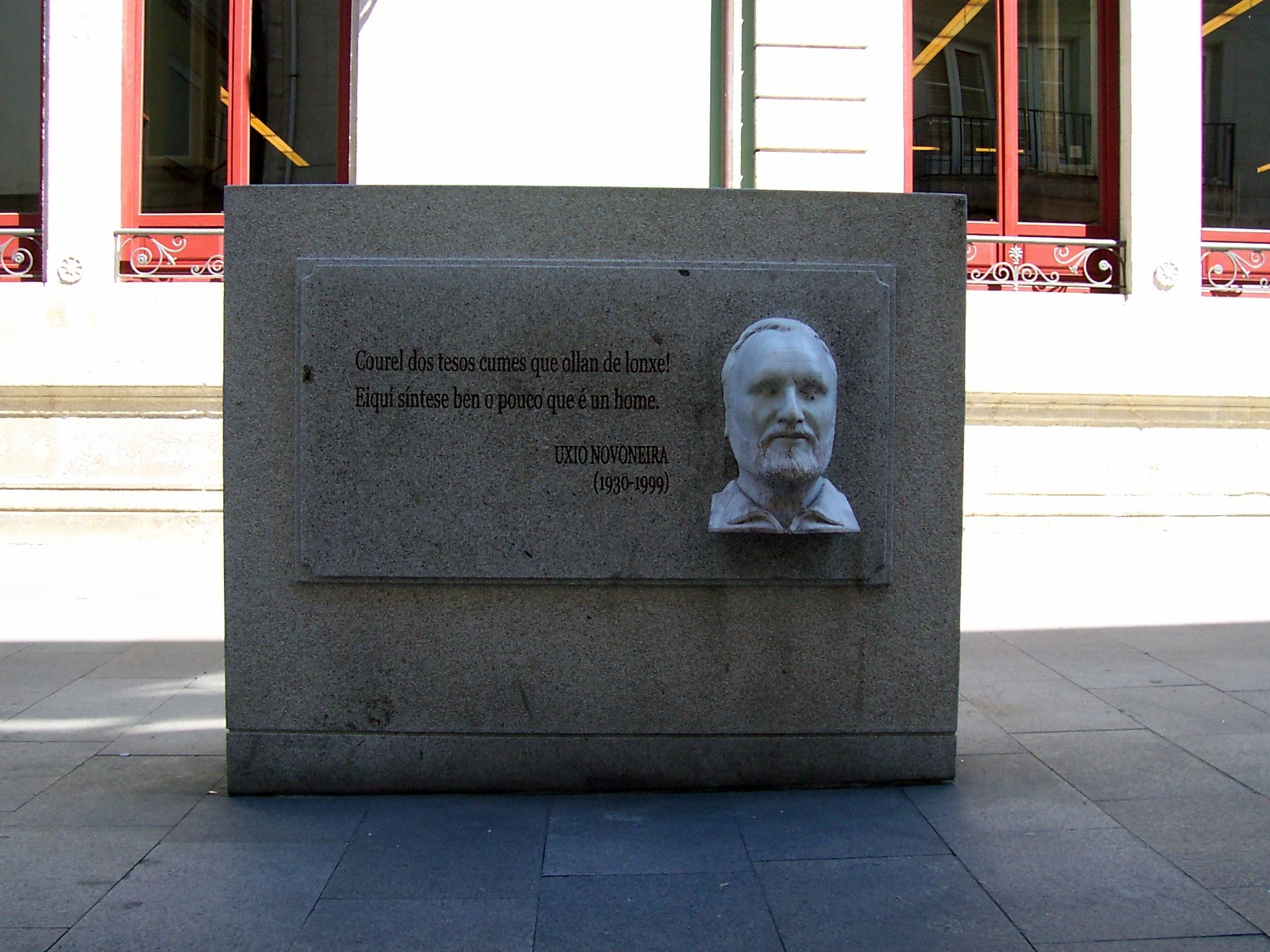
- Monument in honour of Uxío Novoneyra in Lugo's Main Square
- Born: Eugenio Novo Neira; 19 January 1930 Parada de Moreda, Spain
- Died: 30 October 1999 (aged 69) Santiago de Compostela, Spain
- Resting place: Casa Museo de Uxío Novoneyra (2022–); Lugo (1999–2022), Spain
- Occupation: Poet
- Notable works: Os Eidos (1955); Elexías do Caurel e outros poemas (1966); Do Courel a Compostela (1988)
- Partner: Elba Rey (1973–1999)
- Relatives: Branca Novoneyra (daughter); Uxío (son); Arturo (son)

Eugenio Novo Neira, known as Uxío Novoneyra (Parada de Moreda, Courel, 19 January 1930 – Santiago de Compostela, 30 October 1999), was a Galician poet, journalist and writer of children's literature from Galicia, Spain.

He was born into a farming family. He started writing poems when he was at high school in Lugo. He went on to study Philosophy and Literature in Madrid. In 1951, he began publishing in Galician language. In 1962, he began working in TV and radio in Madrid. In 1973, he married Elba Rey and they had three children. In 1983 he moved to Santiago de Compostela where he worked for the Association of Writers in the Galician Language until he died in 1999. In his works, he expresses his nationalist and Marxist views through intricate poetic patterns.

== Life ==
=== Early years ===
His parents were Xosé Novo López, a wealthy farmer, and Manuela Neira Bello. They had three children: José (who died in 1936), Elisa and Uxío. He was the nephew of politician Manuel Novo López. He studied high school in Lugo, from 1942 to 1948, and obtained his bachelor's degree in 1951. He became friends with poet Manuel María in 1945 and with María Mariño in 1947. He also met Luís Pimentel in Lugo.

In 1948 he enrolled in the Faculty of Philosophy and Literature in Madrid as an outside-student. There, he began to write poems in Spanish. He met Xesús Alonso Montero while he was a student at the same college. Alonso Montero kept what he says is Novoneyra's first book of poems, Abrojos. Poemas cortos, unpublished until 2002. During his years as a student, he acquired a certain reputation as a reciter of poetry. The collections of poems entitled Poemas de Dios and Caurel were written in 1950-51. His well-known book Os Eidos would be born from them. Luz Pozo Garza would publish some of these early poems in the Clave Orión magazine in 2000.

In 1952 he did his military service, first in Parga, and then in Santiago de Compostela, and regained contact with Manuel María, who had already published Muiñeiro de brétemas in the Benito Soto Collection. At the end of that same year, he began to write the first poems of what would become Os Eidos.

During this time in Santiago he met and was associated with Carlos Maside, Ramón Piñeiro and Ramón Otero Pedrayo. Thanks to their influence, he started writing in Galician in 1952.

=== The 1950s ===
In 1953 he fell ill with pleurisy and was confined in Courel, where he remained until 1962, except for brief trips to Santiago, Lugo or Madrid. It was during this stay in Courel that he met María Mariño, with whom he would establish a long literary relationship.

In 1955 he published Os Eidos, with poems written between 1952 and 1953. This is a collection of poems that begins a poetic cycle in which he would keep working for many years, with new additions (Os Eidos II, 1974) and modifications. The book was prefaced by Ramón Piñeiro, who defines the book as "the voice of the earth" and highlights the poet's telluric lyricism.

Os Eidos confirmed Novoneyra's status as a poet, getting positive reviews by the likes of Otero Pedrayo, Isidoro Millán González-Pardo, Ánxel Fole, Borobó or Xosé Luís Franco Grande.

In the same year of 1955 he began to publish poetry in newspapers and magazines such as Vida Gallega (where he would publish a total of 15 poems by 1961), Aturuxo, Follas Secas, Luzes de Galiza, Nordés, Ólisbos, Dorna or Ronsel. His poems were included for the first time in a Galician poetic anthology, edited by Francisco Fernández del Riego (Anthology of Galician poetry IV. The Contemporaries, Galaxia 1955).

=== The 1960s ===
Novoneyra returned to Madrid In 1962, where he hosted radio and television programs on international, Spanish and Galician poets. He attended Café Gijón literary gathering, where he met the members of the Galicianist group Brais Pinto, being the painter Reimundo Patiño among them.

He published Elexías do Caurel e outros poemas in 1966, in a bilingual edition in Spanish and Galician. That same year he left Madrid to return to Courel, in order to tend to his sick parents. His father died in 1971and his mother in 1973.

In 1967 he wrote the poem Vietnam Canto for a never published collaborative book titled With Vietnam. The poem was published in 1969 in the Revista Exterior de Poesía Hispana. Novneyra becomes here a less lyrical and intimate, and more committed and politicized poet.

=== The 1970s ===
Novoneyra married Elba Rey (a nurse who had taken care of the poet's sick mother at the end of her life) on January 5, 1973. They had three children: Branca-Petra, Uxío and Arturo.

Os Eidos II was published in 1974. The book collects poem written mainly between 1954 and 1957, but it also includes later poems, as Letanía de Galicia, in which his political commitment becomes evident.

In 1981 he published Os Eidos. Libro do Courel, which revises and collects both volumes together. In 1988 the San Sebastian poet Koldo Izaguirre published a bilingual edition in Basque and Galician under the title Bazterrak / Os Eidos, I and II.

In 1979 he published Poemas caligráficos in collaboration with Xosé Manuel Pereiro and Reimundo Patiño, who provided the prologue. The texts are linked to the pictorial vanguard organized around the Brais Pinto Group.

=== The 1980s ===
In 1983 he settled permanently in Santiago de Compostela. The previous year he had been elected president of the Galician Language Writers Association, a position he held until his death.

In 1984, Xosé Luís Méndez Ferrín published De Pondal a Novoneyra, a book of literary criticism that explores the work of these two most outstanding Galician poets. The book contributed to the canonization of Novoneyra as a poet.

In 1986 he published the love poems of Muller pra lonxe, written between 1955 and 1985. The book was illustrated by the Portuguese painter Carlos Pardo Teijeiro.

Do Courel a Compostela, a compilation of mainly political poems written over 30 years, was released in 1986. The book was illustrated by Laxeiro, Maside e Lorente, and includes a critical anthology.

=== The 1990s ===
In 1991 he published his first narrative book, O cubil do xabaril, a children's book set in the Courel. This book would be followed by other children's books: Gorgorín e Cabezón (1992) and Ilda, o lobo, o corzo e o xabarín (1998).

Also in 1991 he reissued a revised version of Elexías do Caurel e outros poemas under the title Tempo de elexía.

In 1994 he published Poemas de Doada Certeza (i este brillo premido entre as pálpebras), and in 1998 Betanzos: Poema dos Caneiros e Estampas.

Finally, in 1999, already ill, he published Arrodeos e desvíos do Camiño de Santiago e outras rotas, with photographs by Federico García Cabezón and some calligraphic texts by the author.

Novoneyra died at the Gil Casares Hospital in Santiago de Compostela, on Saturday, October 30, 1999. They kept a vigil over his body at San Domingos de Bonaval. He was buried in Lugo's San Froilán Cemetery.

On January 14, 2022, following his last will and testamente, his remains were transferred from Lugo to his house in Parada do Courel, now a museum in his memory.

He was honoured on Galician Literature Day in 2010 .

== Literary style ==
In his poetry, Novoneyra makes explicit its nationalist and Marxist commitment, without ever ceasing to worry about poetic form and language. Formally, he sought the best visual and sound results for the texts (using for this purpose various resources such as phonosymbolism, the use of dialectalisms, silences, or graphic symbolism). With few words he manages to magically evoke the world in which we live.

== Books ==
It is not easy to systematize Uxío Novoneyra's work, since the same poems are frequently published, with more or less relevant modifications, in different books.

- Os eidos (1955). Vigo, Edicións Xerais de Galicia, ISBN 84-7507-455-3
- Os eidos 2. Letanía de Galicia e outros poemas (1974). Vigo, Galaxia, ISBN 84-7154-221-8
- Poemas caligráficos (1979). Madrid, Brais Pinto, ISBN 84-85171-05-5
- Libro do Courel (1981)
- Muller pra lonxe (1987). Lugo, ISBN 84-505-4535-8
- Do Courel a Compostela 1956-1986 (1988). Santiago de Compostela, Sotelo Blanco, ISBN 84-86021-80-4
- O cubil de Xabarín (1990). Madrid, Edlevives, ISBN 84-263-1956-4
- Tempo de elexía (1991). Oleiros, Vía Láctea, ISBN 84-86531-58-6
- Gorgorín e Cabezón (1992). Madrid, Edelvives, ISBN 84-263-2170-4
- Poemas de doada certeza i este brillo premido entre as pálpebras (1994). A Coruña, Espiral Maior, ISBN 84-88137-39-7
- Betanzos: Poema dos Caneiros e Estampas (1998)
- Dos soños teimosos Noitarenga (1998). Santiago de compostela, Noitarenga, ISBN 84-921096-5-3
- Ilda, o lobo, o corzo e o xabarín (1998). Zaragoza, Edelvives, ISBN 84-263-3727-9
- Arrodeos e desvíos do Camiño de Santiago e outras rotas (1999). A Coruña, Hércules Ediciones, ISBN 84-453-2306-7

== Translations ==
- The Uplands. Book of the Courel (2019), Veliz Books, (translated by Erin Moure)
- Poesie della chiara certeza (antologia 1955-1999) (2019), Aquaplano (translated by Marco Paone)
