= Manuel Antonio Pérez =

Manuel Antonio Pérez may refer to

- Manuel Antonio Pérez Pérez (December 2, 1890 – May 7, 1951), three-time interim governor of Puerto Rico better known as Manuel A. Pérez
- Manuel Antonio Pérez Sánchez (July 12, 1900 – January 28, 1930), Galician poet better known as Manuel Antonio
