= Antón Fraguas =

Galicianist historian, ethnographer, anthropologist and geographer

Antonio Fraguas
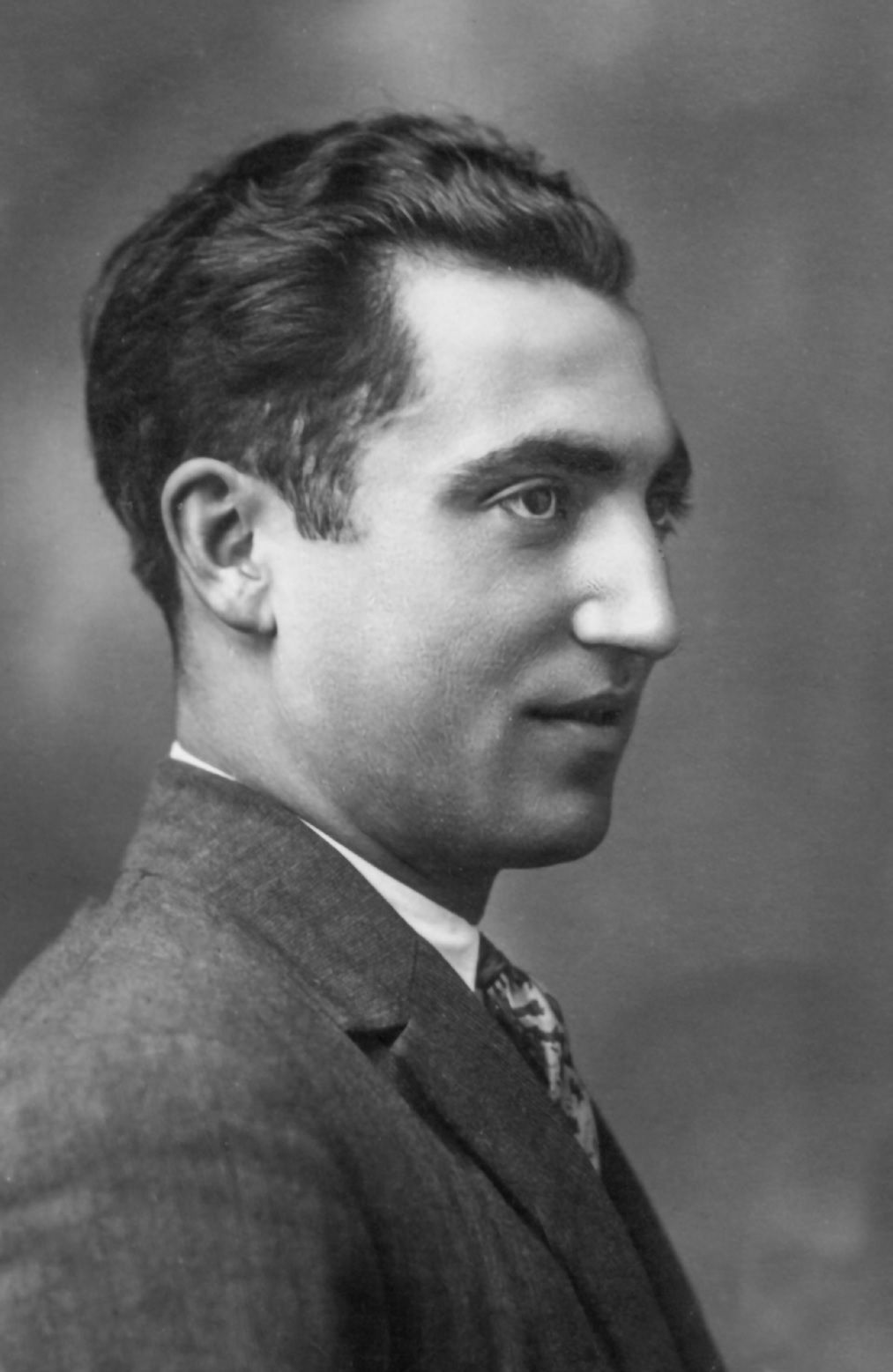
- Born: Antonio Fraguas Fraguas; 28 December 1905; Insuela, Cerdedo-Cotobade
- Died: 5 November 1999 (aged 93); Santiago de Compostela
- Resting place: Boisaca Cemetery
- Education: University of Santiago de Compostela; University of Madrid
- Occupations: Historian, ethnographer, anthropologist, geographer, Secondary education Professor, Director of Museum of the Galician People, general chronicler of Galicia
- Spouse: Teresa Martínez Magariños
- Writing career
- Period: 1923–1999
- Genre: Essay
- Notable awards: Pedrón de Ouro; Medalla Castelao; Premio Trasalba; Premio Otero Pedrayo; Premio das Artes e das Letras S. Martiño de normalización lingüistica

Antonio Fraguas Fraguas (or Antón Fraguas Fraguas) was Galicianist historian, ethnographer, anthropologist, and geographer. In 1923, he cofounded the Sociedade da Lingua, whose main goals were the defense of the Galician language and the creation of a dictionary. He was a member of Irmandades da Fala and Seminario de Estudos Galegos and was high school professor after the Spanish Civil War broke out. He was part of the Father Sarmiento Institute for Galician Studies and the Royal Galician Academy, and was director and president of the Museum of the Galician People, member of the Council of Galician Culture, and a chronicler of Galicia. He spent his life studying Galician culture and its territory from different perspectives, with a special focus and mastery on anthropology.

== Life ==
He was born in Insuela (Santiago de Loureiro, Cotobade), on 28 December 1905. His father was Manuel Fraguas Rodrigues, a single stonemason who emigrated to Niterói—capital of the state of Rio de Janeiro at the time, shortly before Fraguas was born. His mother was Teresa Fraguas Vázquez, also the daughter of a stonemason, was born in Listanco (Armeses, Maside) in 1873.

He went to public school in Costa.

His father came back from America in 1912, then married his mother and recognized his son on 7 August of that year. In 1918, his parents decided to emigrate together to Brazil, where Antonio was meant to become a train driver, learning from his father's cousin. But the idea was reconsidered because of a teacher in Famelga (Augasantas), who saw his potencial to become a teacher.

== Education ==
From 1919 to 1924 he attended secondary school in Pontevedra, where some of his teachers were Daniel Fraga Aguiar, Alfredo de la Iglesia, Ramón Sobrino Buhigas, Alfonso Daniel Rodríguez Castelao and especially Antón Losada Diéguez, who influenced him and turned him toward Galicianism. In 1923, at the age of 18, he established the “Sociedade da Lingua” (Language Society) in Pontevedra along with Sebastián González García-Paz and other fellow students. Its goal was to defend the Galician language and publish a dictionary, which they did not accomplish. In 1924, he began studying Philosophy and Literature at the USC

His first public appearance was to present Joaquín Núñez de Couto, and speak out against tyrants. The first year he went to a preparatory school, where there were three professors: Ciriaco Pérez Bustamante (History), Armando Cotarelo Valledor (Literature) and Ramón Gallego García (Philosophy).

He lived in Santiago de Compostela in number 24 Horreo Street (Rúa do Hórreo). Encouraged by Ramón Martínez López, he joined the Irmandade da Fala, which was presided over by Vicente Risco. He started to collaborate with the Seminario de Estudios Galegos, where he was admitted as a member in 1928, in the Geography department (directed by Ramón Otero Pedrayo), Ethnography department (directed by Risco) and Prehistory department (directed by Florentino López Cuevillas).

At the seminary, the grant from the Junta para Amplificación de Estudios allowed him to participate in the cataloging of castros in the area around Lalin and he started studying Galicia's historic geography. He also focused on the Rías Baixas and the Cotobade area.

As an ethnographer, he started studying Galician Carnival traditions. He also was a librarian in the institution. He was dedicated to compiling Galician bibliographies and he participated in the foundation of the Museo Etnográfico do Seminario at the Colexio de Fonseca.

He graduated in 1928. In 1929 he started studying geography and history at Santiago de Compostela University, where he worked as a teacher until 1933.

He married Teresa Martínez in Valga on 16 July 1932.

== Career ==
He was a teacher in A Estrada from 1933 until the Spanish Civil War. In July 1936 he founded La Voz de Cotobade.

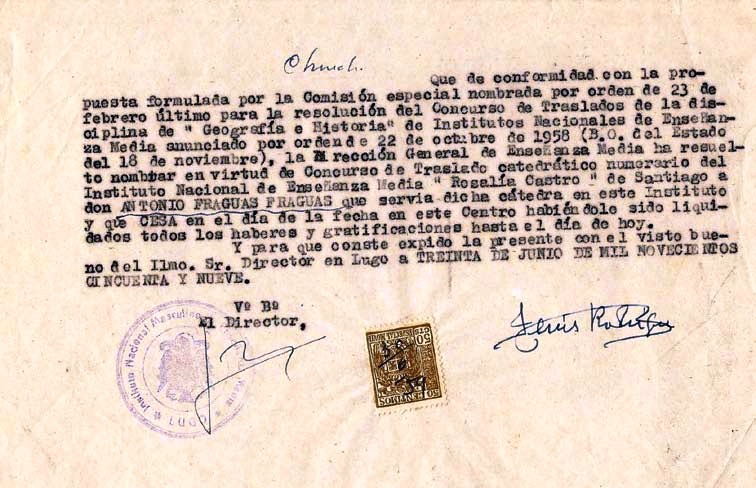
Transfer from Lugo to Santiago, 1959.

He participated in the campaigns for the statute of 1936 and after the July 1936 military uprising in Melilla. He suffered repression due to his Galicianist leanings, and was fired.

After his arrest, he was forced to delete the graffiti in favor of the statute. He had to work in private education and, with the priest Ramon Davila Garcia, created the Academia Menendez y Pelayo in the country house of Amarante starting in 1950. He was able to retake high school classes and also was awarded a doctorate at the Complutense University of Madrid. On 6 May 1950, he was named Professor of Geography and History in the Instituto Nacional Masculino de Lugo. There he was a secretary and Director of Studies. He also collaborated with the Museo Provincial and with the Museo Diocesano e Catedralicio.

In 1959, he requested to move to Santiago's Instituto Nacional de Enseñanza Media Rosalia de Castro, where he worked as a Director of Studies until he retired in 1975.

Fraguas was one of the protagonists of the transformation of the Seminario de Estudos Galegos, which was dissolved on Franco's orders. In the Instituto de Estudos Galegos Padre Sarmiento created in 1944, he worked as librarian, secretary and director of the section of Ethnography and Folklore, publishing his research in the Cuadernos de Estudios Galegos magazine.

On the 19 April 1951 he was named tenure member of the Real Academia Gallega (English: Royal Galician Academy), where he was admitted on 8 May, taking over Castelao's place. He was introduced by Salustiano Portela Pazos, Ramón Otero Pedrayo and Luís Iglesias Iglesias, and his entrance speech “Roseiras e paxariños nas cantigas dun serán (Coplas que se cantaban nas ruadas de Loureiro de Cotobade)”, was answered by Otero Pedrayo. In 1997 he became the President of the Institution.

Álbum de la Caridad, copy from the Antonio Fraguas Fraguas Library belonging to the Museo do Pobo Galego.

In 1955 he worked at the Sociedade Económica de Amigos do País de Santiago (English: Economic Society of Friends of the Country in Santiago) library. In 1963 he was appointed Director of the Municipal Museum of Santiago, situated in St Dominic Monastery, which is now called the Museo do Pobo Galego (English: Museum of the Galician People) in 1975. Xaquín Lorenzo was the president of the foundation, and after his death in 1989, Fraguas took on the posts of director and president.

In 1969 Fraguas organized, in collaboration with Xoán Naya Pérez and Ricardo Carballo Calero, an exposition about the traditional Galician dress for the Padre Sarmiento Institute.

Other roles and activities that Fraguas carried out in his life were the coordination of the Cultural Anthropology section of the Galician Culture Council; promoter, librarian of the Real Academia Galega de Ciencias; correspondent for the Real Academia de la Historia, the Associação dos Arqueólogos Portugueses and the Portuguese Association of Anthropology and Ethnography. In 1992 the council of the Xunta de Galicia proclaimed Fraguas general chronicler of Galicia. In 1994 he donated his personal library of around 20,000 volumes.

He died of heart disease at the Santiago Clinic Hospital on November 5, 1999 at the age of 93. His wake was held at the auditorium in the Galician People Museum, before his remains were laid to rest next to Aurelio Aguirre and Ramón María del Valle Inclán, in Boisaca cemetery.

== Awards and honours ==
During his life, his importance was recognized by these awards: Pedrón de Ouro, Castelao Medal, Premio Trasalba, Premio Otero Pedrayo, Premio das Artes e das Letras de Galicia and Premio San Martiño de normalización lingüística. On July 7th, 2018, the Real Academia Galega decided that Fraguas would have the 2019 Día das Letras Galegas dedicated to him, coinciding with the 20th anniversary of his death.

== Gallery ==
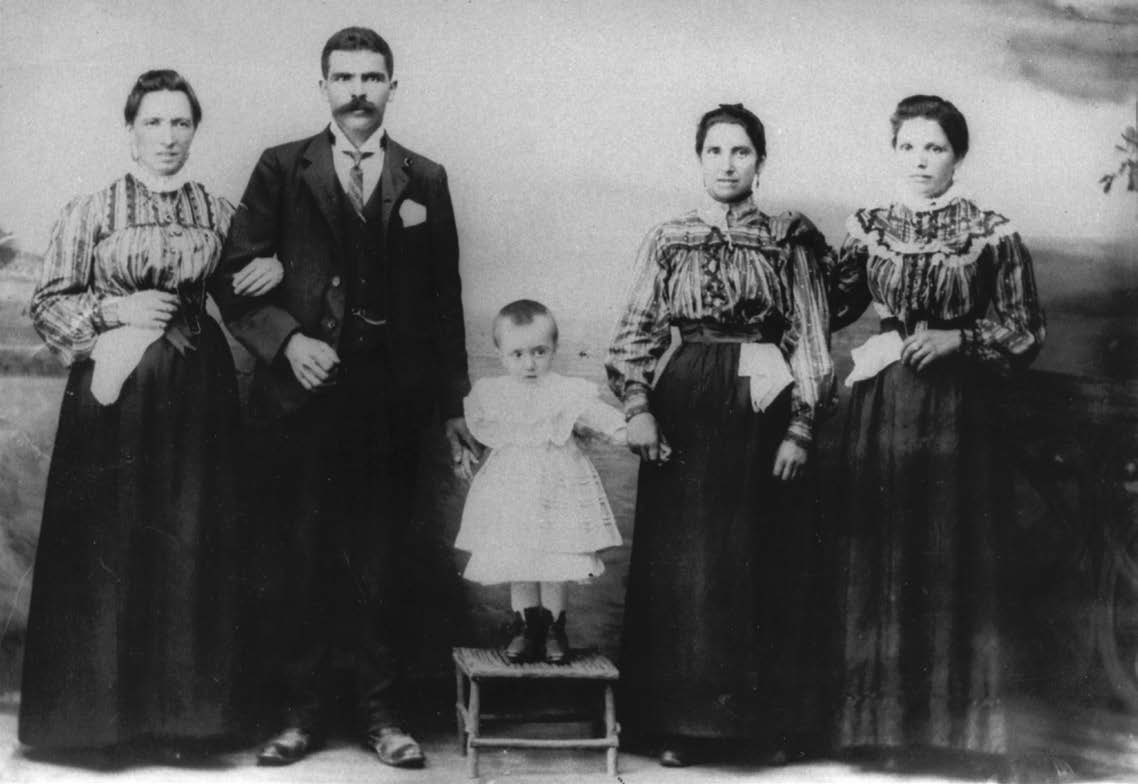
Little Antón with his mother, aunt and uncle.

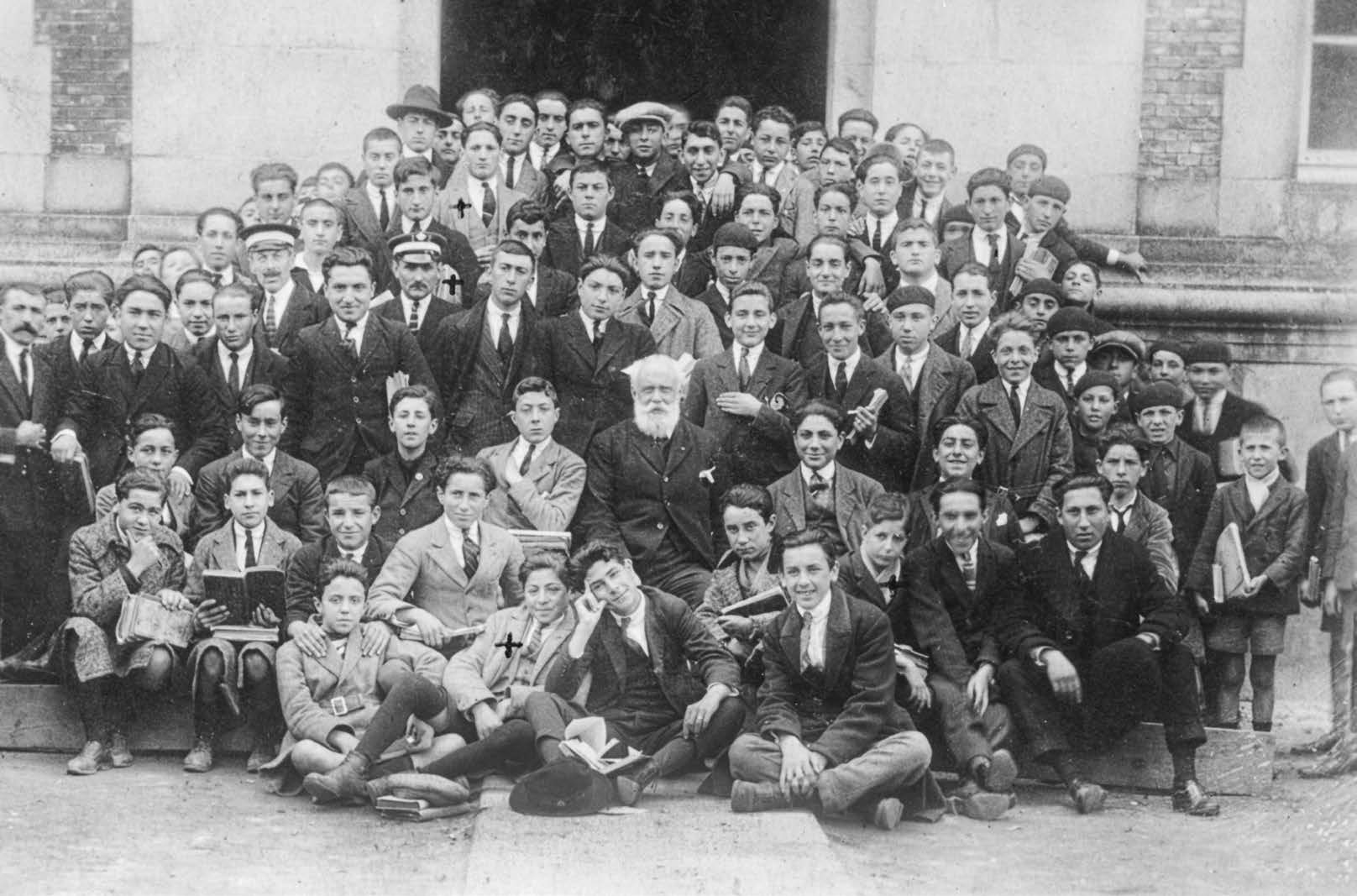
Students of Pontevedra High School with the teacher Alfredo de la Iglesia, 1922.

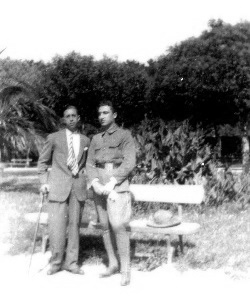

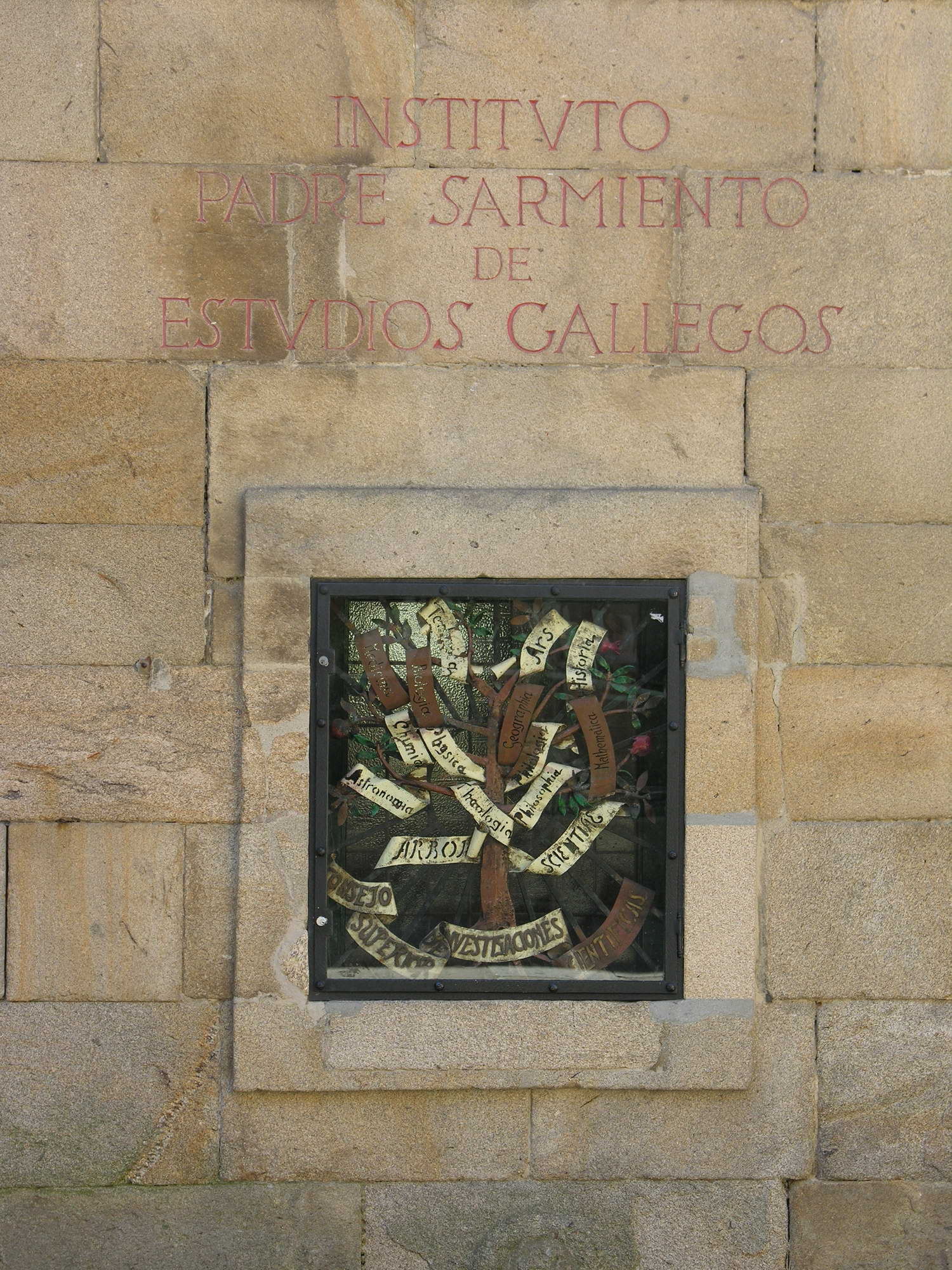
Padre Sarmiento Institute of Galician Studies in Santiago de Compostela.

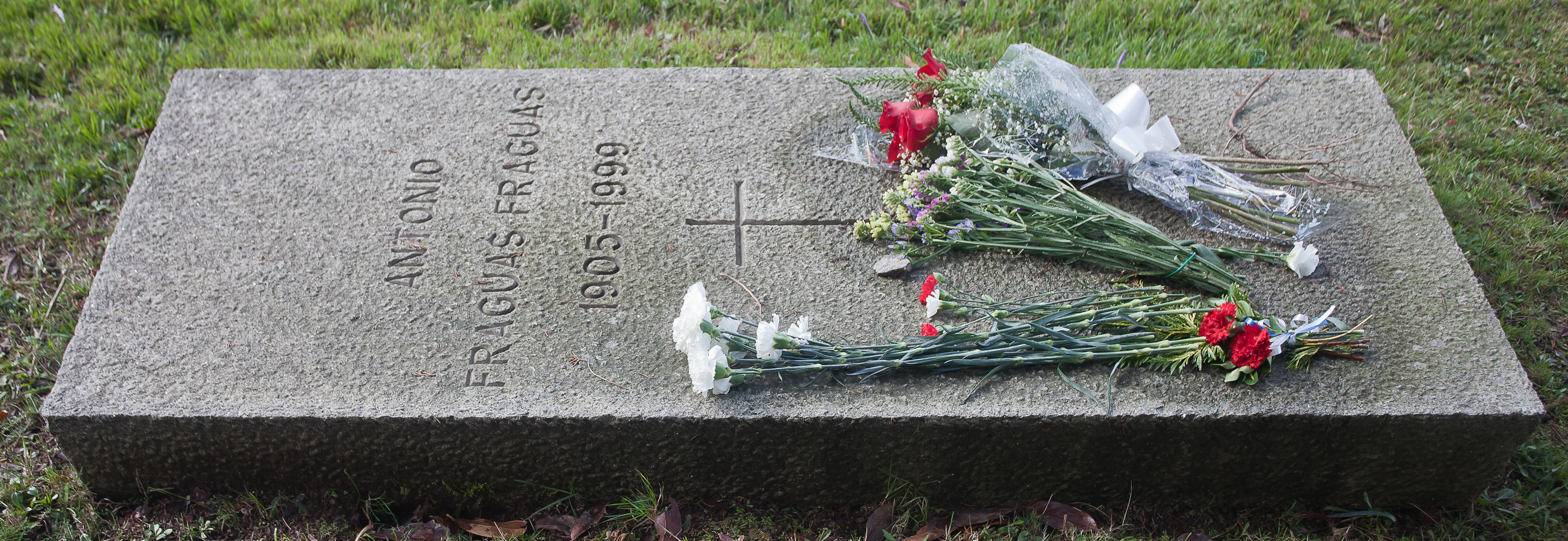
Tomb of Antonio Fraguas in Boisaca, Santiago de Compostela

== Works ==
- Geografía de Galicia (1953)
- Galicia insólita (1973)
- Lugo (1974)
- Murguía, o patriarca (1979)
- Literatura oral en Galicia (1980)
- El traje gallego (1985)
- Aportacións ó cancioneiro de Cotobade (1985)
- Aquilino Iglesia Alvariño: vida e obra (1986)
- Romarías e santuarios (1988)
- Celso Emilio Ferreiro (1989)
- La Puerta Santa (1993)
- Do Entroido (1994)
- As cousas de Antonio de Insuela (1996)
- A festa popular en Galicia (1996)

In addition to previous publications, Fraguas wrote numerous well-known articles in specialized and non-specialized newspapers and magazines, as well as collaborations in joint publications with other Galician ethnographic personalities.
