= Xosé María Díaz Castro =

Galician poet and translator (1914–1990)

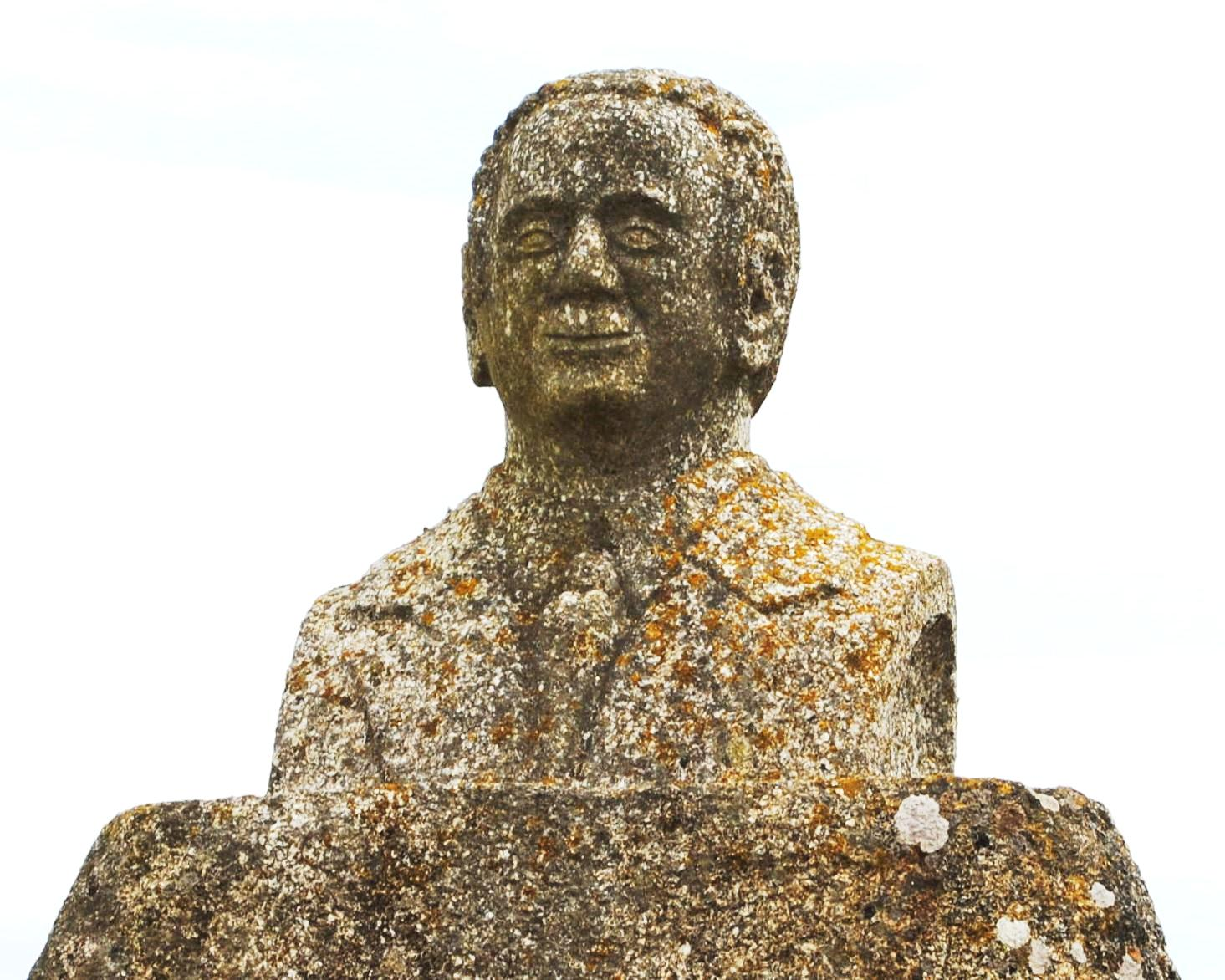
- Born: Xosé María Díaz Castro; 19 February 1914; Guitiriz, Galicia
- Died: 2 October 1990 (aged 76); Lugo, Galicia
- Education: University of Salamanca
- Occupations: Writer and translator
- Spouse: María Teresa Zubizarreta Bengoechea
- Children: Three (José Mari, Maite and Íñigo)
- Writing career
- Language: Galician

Xosé María Díaz Castro (19 February 1914 – 2 October 1990) was a Galician poet and translator. In 2014, Galician Literature Day was dedicated to him.

== Original work ==
- Nimbos (1961) ISBN 978-84-7154-075-1.

== Translations ==
Castro translated multiple authors' works into both Spanish and English.

Authors whose works he translated to Spanish include Verner von Heidenstam, Henrik Pontoppidan, Johannes Vilhelm Jensen, Rainer Maria Rilke, William Butler Yeats, T. S. Eliot, Walt Whitman, G. K. Chesterton, Frederick Forsyth, Friedrich Schiller, Arthur Rimbaud, Paul Valéry, Alphonse de Lamartine and Paul Claudel.

Authors whose works he translated into English include Federico García Lorca and Rafael Alberti.

== Further information ==
- AAVV; Homenaxe a X. M. Díaz Castro, Xermolos, Guitiriz, 1987, 192 p., ISBN 84-404-1089-1.
- Blanco Torrado, A.; A ascensión dun poeta, Xosé María Díaz Castro, Novacaixagalicia, Compostela, 1995, 143 p., ISBN 978-84-89231-17-7.
- Requeixo, Armando;, Xosé María Díaz Castro, vida e obra, Editorial Galaxia, Vigo, 2014, 200 p., ISBN 978-84-9865-516-2.
