= Johan de Cangas =

Johan de Cangas (or Xohan de Cangas in an anachronistically modernized Galician form) was a jograr or non-noble troubadour, probably active during the thirteenth century. He seems to have been from—or associated with – Cangas do Morrazo, a small town of Pontevedra, Galicia (Spain). Only three of his songs survive. All three are cantigas de amigo and in each of them the girl mentions a religious site (ermida) at San Momede do Mar ("San Momede of the Sea"). These references to the sea may be symbolic (symbolizing sexuality) as they are real (given the geography), but they have earned this poet the designation of "singer of the sea". In the first text, a girl asks her mother for permission to go see her boyfriend at San Momede do Mar; in the second she informs her mother that the boyfriend did not come and she has surely lost him; in the third she asks her boyfriend to meet her there, and not to break his word to her again.

As with most jograes, nothing is known for certain about his life, although the preservation of three of his cantigas suggests that he performed in the courts of local nobles. The location of the poet's compositions in the manuscript tradition, the use of a place-name (Cangas) in lieu of a surname, and the form and rhetoric of his songs all seem to confirm his status as a jograr.

In both manuscripts (Cancioneiro da Vaticana and Cancioneiro da Biblioteca Nacional) his name is spelled Johan (the modern Galician equivalent being Xoán, Portuguese João). Johan de Cangas had attracted almost no critical attention until 1998, when the Galician Literature Day was dedicated to him and to two other "singers of the sea", Martín Codax and Mendinho.

== Example ==
A cantiga de amigo of Johan de Cangas (ed. R. Cohen; tr. R. Cohen)

Amigo, se mi gran ben queredes,
id’ a San Momed’ e veer m’ edes;
oje non mi mençades, amigo!

Pois mh aqui ren non podedes dizer,
id’ u ajades comigo lezer;
oje non mi mençades, amigo!

Serei vosc’ en San Momede do mar
na ermida, se mho Deus aguisar;
oje non mi mençades, amigo!

Friend, if you really love me a lot,
Go to San Momede and you can see me.
Friend, don’t break your word to me today.

Since you can’t say anything to me here,
Go where you can have pleasure with me.
Friend, don’t break your word to me today.

I’ll be with you in San Momede of the Sea
In the chapel, if God guides me there.
Friend, don’t break your word to me today.
