= Eladio Rodríguez =

Galician writer

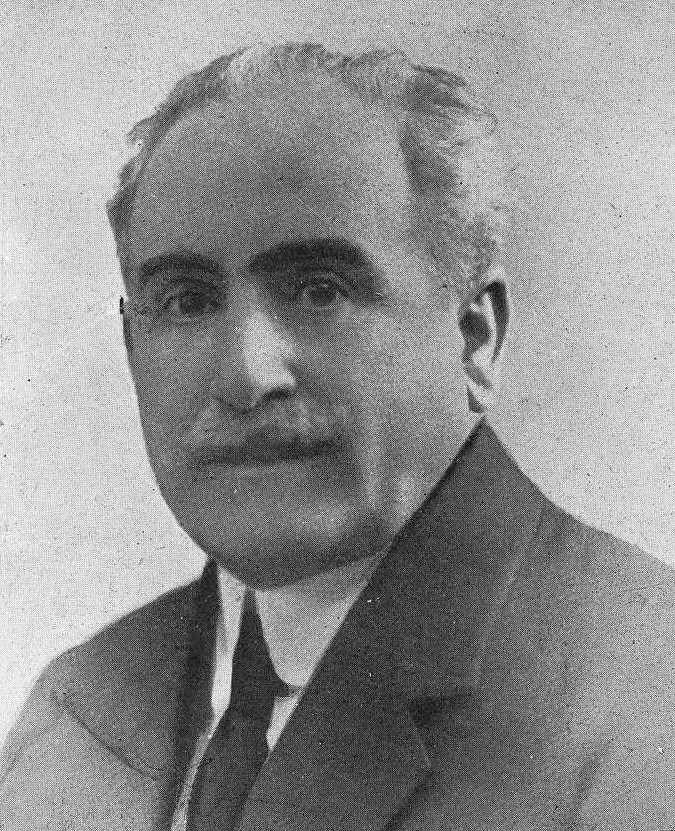
Eladio Rodríguez.

Signature.

Eladio Rodríguez González (July 27, 1864 – April 14, 1949) was a Galician language poet and author associated with the Galicia region of Spain. In 2001, he was honored in the Galician Literature Day.

== Background ==
He was a Spanish lexicographer and writer in Galician and Spanish. He was one of the forty founding members of the Royal Galician Academy, which he presided over between 1926 and 1934. He was also the author of a dictionary, the "Diccionario enciclopedico Gallego-Castellano", to which he dedicated his whole life, highly valued for its ethnographic content that was published posthumously.
