= Rianxo =

Coordinates: 42.65°N 8.81667°W

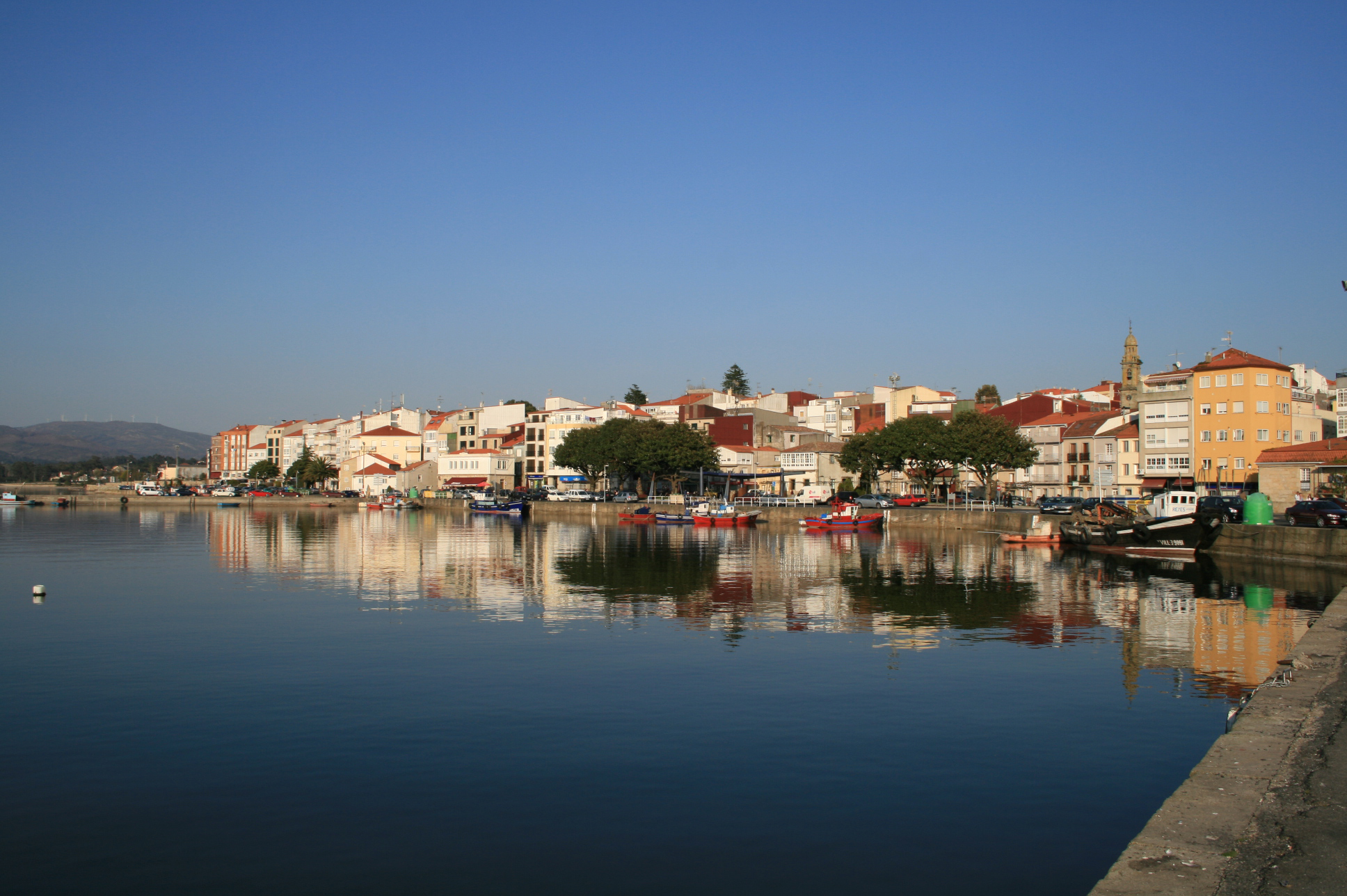
- Town view.

- Flag Seal

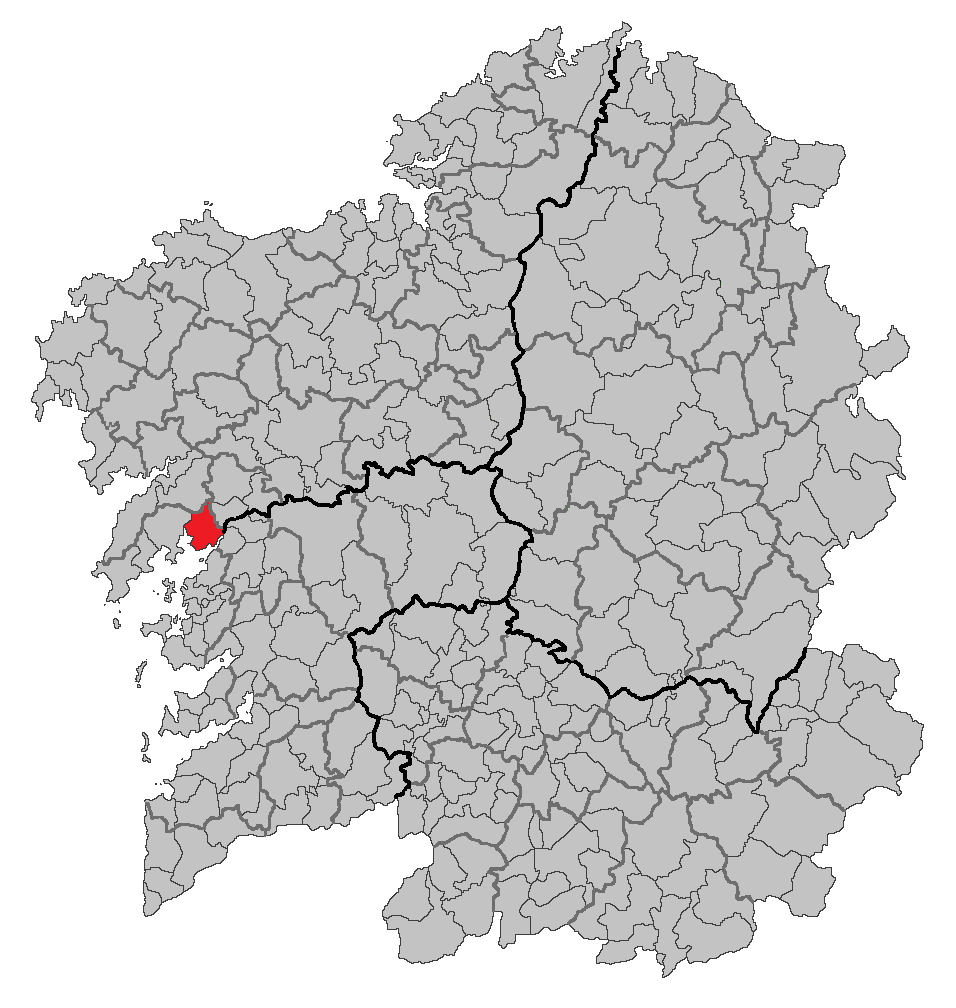
- Situation of Rianxo within Galicia
- Parroquias: O Araño, Asados, Rianxo, Isorna, Leiro, Taragoña

Government
  - Alcalde (Mayor): Julián Bustelo Abuín

Population (2025-01-01)
  - Total: 10,758
- (INE)
- Time zone: UTC+1 (CET)
  - Summer (DST): UTC+2 (CEST)
- Website: http://www.rianxo.com

Rianxo is a port town and municipality in the autonomous community of Galicia in northwestern Spain in the province of A Coruña. It has a population of 11,000 and its two main industries are fishing and tourism. The town's yearly celebration of Our Lady of Guadalupe is popular with tourists. Rianxo was the birthplace of several influential Galician writers, including Paio Gómez Chariño ^{gl}, Manuel Antonio, Alfonso R. Castelao and Rafael Dieste.

== List of parishes ==
It has 6 parroquias^{gl}

- O Araño^{gl}
- Asados^{gl}
- Isorna ^{gl}
- Leiro ^{gl}
- Rianxo ^{gl}
- Taragoña ^{gl}

== See also ==
List of municipalities in A Coruña
