= Xela Arias =

Galician poet and translator (1962–2003)

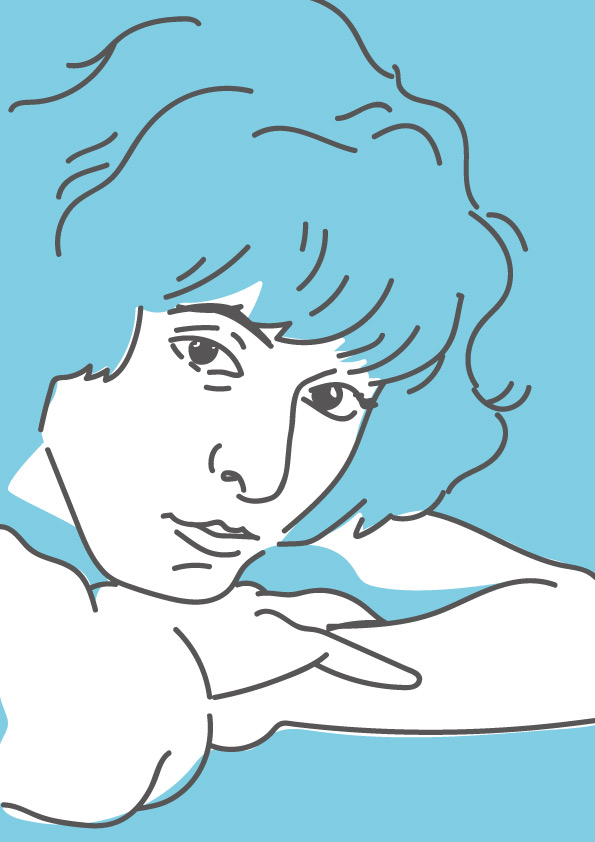

Xela Arias Castaño (1962–2003) was a Spanish Galician-language poet and translator.

Although she published only four poetry collections, she is considered a major voice of Galician literature for "contributing to the renewal of Galician poetry by bringing new topics and a very personal style."

In 2021 the Galician Literature Day was dedicated to her.

Xela Arias translated works by Jorge Amado, Camilo Castelo Branco, James Joyce, Fenimore Cooper and Wenceslao Fernández Flórez into Galician.

== Life ==
Xela Arias was born in Lugo in 1962, but soon moved to Vigo, where she spent most of her life. In 1980 Xela Arias began to publish in Spanish (in Galician, mostly) and Portuguese newspapers and magazines such as A Nosa Terra, Diario 16 de Galicia, Faro de Vigo, Jornal de Noticias do Porto, Dorna, Tintimán, Carel or Katarsis. She collaborated to periodicals in Galician such as Festa da Palabra Silenciada, Luzes de Galiza or the Boletín Galego de Literatura, among others.

She died of a heart attack in 2003.

Her collected works were published in November 2018, bringing together her 4 published poetry collections, Denuncia do equilibro, Tigres coma cabalos, Darío a día and Intempériome.

== Works ==
- Denuncia do equilibrio, 1986
- Tigres coma cabalos, 1990
- Darío a diario, 1996
- Intempériome, 2003
