= Carlos Casares Mouriño =

Galician language writer (1941–2002)

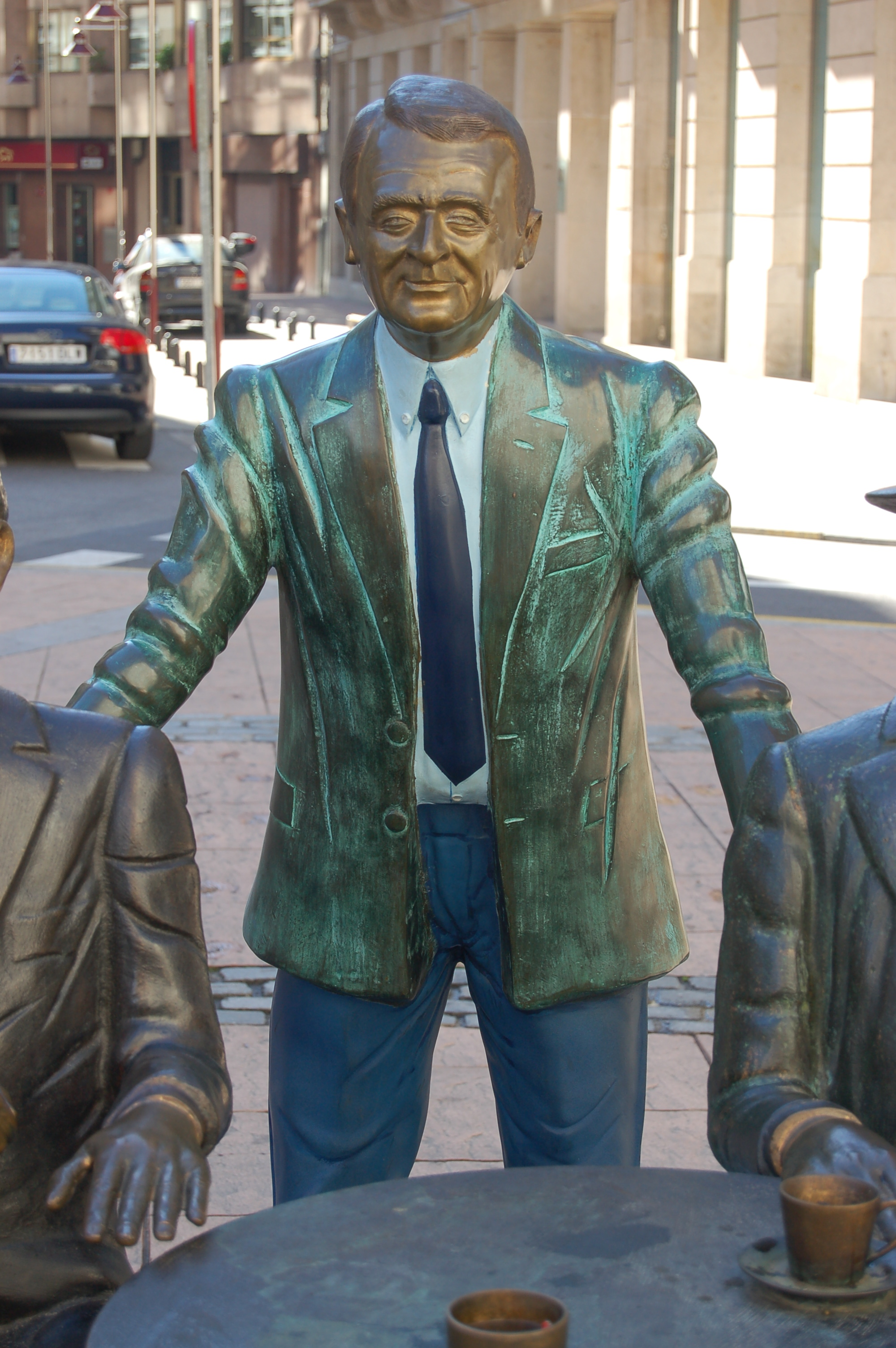
- Carlos Casares Monument
- Born: 24 August 1941 Ourense, Galicia
- Died: 9 March 2002 (aged 60) Nigrán, Pontevedra, Galicia
- Language: Galician
- Genre: Narrative

Carlos Casares Mouriño (24 August 1941 in Ourense – 9 March 2002 in Nigrán) was a Galician language writer.

== Life ==
Carlos Casares was born in Ourense into a middle-class family in 1941. When he was three years old, his family moved to Xinzo de Limia, where his father was a teacher, thus spending his early years in this Galician rural area. He got close to Galician language, the main language he would be in contact with in the area except for his mother, who spoke Spanish.

His family had strong religious beliefs, and, in fact, some of his relatives were priests and one was an archbishop. Due to his family's religiosity, he was sent to the Seminary in Ourense, where he received humanistic education between 1952 and 1957. During those years, he experienced enormous repression for being a speaker of Galician language. This stimulated a nonconformist spirit that led him to his first literary involvement, a clandestine magazine called El averno. Because of this, Carlos left the Seminary and self-studied the last years of Secondary Education. He consequently had a lot of free time to begin his literary creation. Winning a literary prize in Ourense gave him the possibility of meeting Galician intellectual Vicente Risco. Afterwards, he started attending the talks Risco gave in "Café Parque".

After finishing his studies, Casares established himself in Santiago de Compostela and there he began his college studies in Philosophy and Languages. He did so between the years 1961 and 1967, specialising in Romanic philology. At University, he met Arcadio López-Casanova and, thanks to him, Ramón Piñeiro, thus involving in the centre of the Galician cultural movement against caudillo Francisco Franco. However, it was not all reduced to cultural activity. Carlos Casares became part of ADE (Asociación Democrática de Estudiantes, Democratic Student Association), and FELIPE (Frente de Liberación Popular, People's Liberation Front). This is where, in the writer's words, he "discovered Marxism and felt like a Marxist". During those university years, he did not forget his literary work either. In 1965, he published several tales in Grial magazine. In 1967, his first novel, Vento Ferido (Wounded Wind), came out, published by Galaxia in its Illa Nova collection.

When he finished his university studies, he came back to Xinzo and started searching for a job as a teacher. He tried to achieve a position in Ourense, but he finally got it in Viana do Bolo, as an assistant teacher in the school "Colegio Libre Asociado". There he underwent some conflicts with the school's principal because he organised certain activities the Francoist State did not approve of. Due to this fact, he was forbidden to teach in Galicia by the Vice-chancellor of Santiago University. He emigrated to Biscay, in the Basque Country, and taught there, but he returned after a short period of time because of external causes.

When returning from this trip, he met Kristina Berg, a Swedish girl who would eventually become his wife. Carlos visited Sweden frequently and discovered there its open, democratic and advanced society. Sweden was also the place where his children (Hakan and Christian) were born.

In 1974, public examinations were held in Galicia, and Carlos achieved a position as a Spanish language teacher in a school in Cangas do Morrazo. However, he was reprimanded a short time after that, along with Méndez Ferrín, Alonso Montero and Francisco Rodríguez.

A year later, Casares won the Galaxia literary prize, on the 25th anniversary of this publishing group. Due to this fact, he was acknowledged as one of the most innovative and significant emerging voices of Galician narrative prose. He also wrote essays studying Galician intellectuals, like Otero Pedrayo, Vicente Risco or Curros Enríquez, and became the youngest member of the Real Academia Galega (Royal Galician Academy) in 1977.

Despite all the work he did as an essayist, Carlos Casares did not forget literature, and continued publishing some highly welcomed narrative works. He wrote Os escuros soños de Clío (1979); Ilustrísima (1980) and, after leaving his career as a member of parliament, also Os mortos daquel verán (1987), Deus sentado nun sillón azul (1996) and O sol do verán (2002).

=== Political involvement ===
Carlos Casares was part of Galician political life during the years of the democratic transition to democracy after Franco's death. He was one of the instigators of a manifest called Realidade Galega (Galician reality), whose objective was achieving a Statute of Autonomy for Galicia similar to that of Catalonia and the Basque Country. Carlos Casares and his friend and partner Ramón Piñeiro were therefore at the forefront of Galician politics at the time. This is why both of them were included as independents in the Spanish Socialist Workers' Party's political candidatures and became members of the first Galician Parliament in 1981.

In the Parliament, both made a great effort to create a language policy for Galicia, with the Language Policy Act being passed in 1983. A new institution called Consello da Cultura Galega (Galician Culture Council) was also created that year as a result of their work. However, his political involvement did not meet his expectations and he did not run again for election. He thus focused just in cultural work and he became chairman of Consello da Cultura Galega between 1996 and 2002. He also directed Galaxia publishing group (1986–2002) and Grial magazine.

In the 90s, Carlos Casares travelled along the world and got involved in a large number of conferences and gatherings. He attended PEN International congresses held in Maastrich, Toronto and Santiago de Compostela, was part of the Literarisches Kolloquium in Berlin and taught Galician language around the world, in cities like New York.

Carlos Casares died on 9 March 2002 due to a cardiac crisis.

== Works ==
=== Magazines ===
Carlos Casares collaborated in several magazines and newspapers. He was chief editor of Grial magazine from 1989 until he died in 2002. Casares published articles in several newspapers as La Región or El País. The newspaper he was more linked to was La Voz de Galicia, where he published in diverse sections. For example, he published in the section Ledicia de ler (The joy of reading) between 1975 and 1992 and informed of new Galician books. Another section he wrote for was A Marxe (The margin), where he included his personal anecdotes. This section was published irregularly but on a daily basis from July 1992 until the day he died.

=== Narrative prose ===
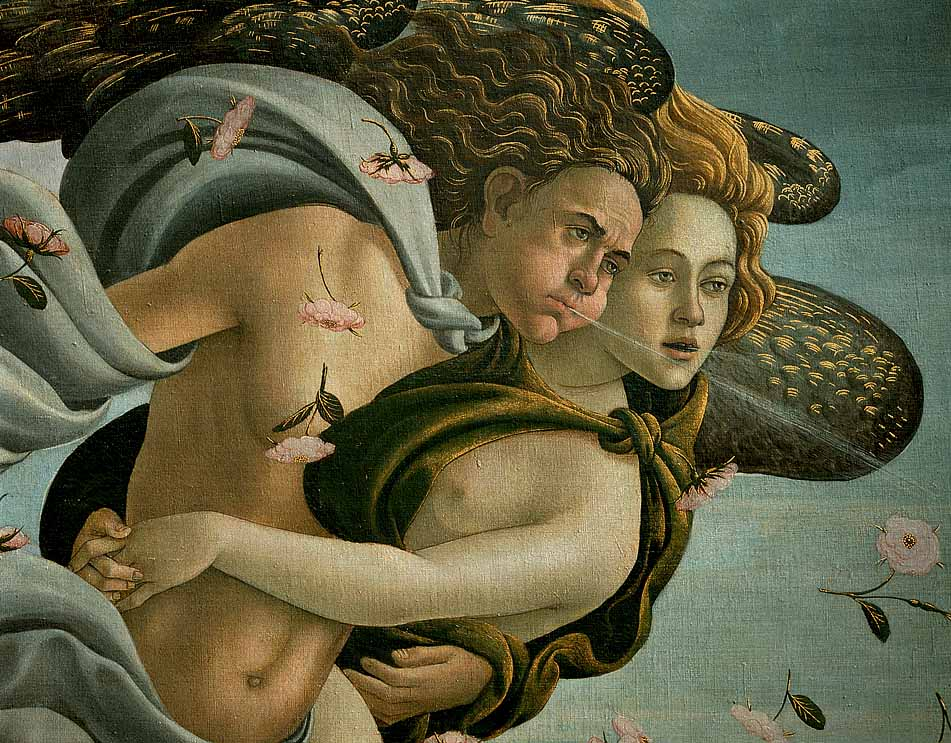
A fragment of Botticelli's The birth of Venus was used for Wounded Wind's cover.

- Vento ferido (1967, Galaxia). Short stories about violence and fatalism, translated into English as Wounded Wind by Rosa Rutherford in 2004 and published by Planet.
- Cambio en tres (1969, Galaxia).
- Xoguetes pra un tempo prohibido (1975, Galaxia).
- Os escuros soños de Clío (1979, Galaxia). Translated into Spanish as Los oscuros sueños de Clío by Xesús Rábade Paredes in 1994 and published by Anagrama.
- Ilustrísima (1980, Galaxia). Translated into Spanish in 1981 by Basilio Losada, published by Luis de Baralt (Barcelona).
- Os mortos daquel verán (1987, Galaxia).
- Deus sentado nun sillón azul (1996, Galaxia).
- O sol do verán (2002, Galaxia).

=== Essays ===
- Manuel Curros Enríquez (1980, Galaxia).
- Otero Pedrayo (1981, Galaxia).
- Vicente Risco (1981, Galaxia).
- Conversas con Ánxel Fole (1984, Galaxia).
- Francisca Herrera Garrido (1987, Real Academia Galega).
- Ramón Otero Pedrayo (1988, Real Academia Galega).
- Ramón Piñeiro: unha vida por Galicia (1991, Caixa Galicia. 2005, Galaxia).
- Fermín Bouza Brey (1992, Real Academia Galega).
- Na marxe de cada día: follas dun diario (1994, La Voz de Galicia).
- A vida de Ánxel Fole (1996, Galaxia).
- Guía da provincia de Pontevedra: arte, cultura e gastronomía (1996).
- Ramón Piñeiro (1996, Xunta de Galicia).
- Ánxel Fole: escolma de textos (1997, Real Academia Galega).
- Hemingway en Galicia (1999, Galaxia).
- Un país de palabras (1999, Galaxia).
- Biografía de Don Juan de la Coba (2000, Galaxia).
- A vida do padre Sarmiento (2001, Galaxia).
- Conciencia de Galicia: Risco, Otero, Curros : tres biografías (2004, Galaxia).
- Á marxe, 1992. Obra xornalística I (2005, Galaxia).
- Á marxe, 1993. Obra xornalística II (2005, Galaxia).
- Á marxe, 1994. Obra xornalística III (2006, Galaxia).
- Á marxe, 1995. Obra xornalística IV (2006, Galaxia).
- Á marxe, 1996. Obra xornalística V (2007, Galaxia).
- Á marxe, 1997. Obra xornalística VI (2007, Galaxia).
- Á marxe, 1998. Obra xornalística VII (2008, Galaxia).

=== Children's literature ===
- A galiña azul (1968, Galaxia).
- As laranxas máis laranxas de tódalas laranxas (1973, Galaxia).
- O can Rin e o lobo Crispín (1983).
- Este é Toribio (1991, Galaxia).
- Toribio contra o profesor Smith (1991, Galaxia).
- Toribio e o contador de contos (1991, Galaxia).
- Toribio ten unha idea (1992, Galaxia).
- Toribio revoluciona o tráfico (1994, Galaxia).
- O galo de Antioquía (1994).
- Lolo anda en bicicleta (1996, Galaxia).
- Un polbo xigante (2000, Galaxia).

=== Biographer and essayist ===
As a biographer and essayist he wrote about the life and works of Vicente Risco, Otero Pedrayo, Ramón Piñeiro, Curros Enríquez and Martín Sarmiento. He also wrote about Ernest Hemingway's presence in Galicia and about Galicia in this author's works, Hemingway en Galicia (1999).

Humor, straightforwardness and clarity were the most important characteristics of his narrative and essay style when writing about issues that affect the current world.

=== Translator ===
He translated O principiño (1972) by the French Antoine de Saint-Exupéry, Os escaravellos voan á tardiña (1989) by the Swedish Maria Gripe and O vello e o mar (1998) by the American Ernest Hemingway.

=== Collective works ===
- Contos da xustiza (1991, Ir Indo).
- Os contos da campaña (2) (1992, Xunta de Galicia).
- O mundo desde aquí (1993, IGADI).
- Unha liña no ceo (58 narradores galegos 1979–1996) (1996, Xerais).
- Para ler a Vicente Risco (1997, Galaxia). With Arturo Lezcano and Antón Risco.
- Novos exercicios de estilo (2000, Universidade da Coruña).
- Palabras con fondo (2001, Fondo Galego de Cooperación e Solidariedade).
- Poetas e Narradores nas súas voces (Vol. I) (2001, Consello da Cultura Galega).
- Galicia: nai e señora (2002, Nigra).
- Narradio. 56 historias no ar (2003, Xerais).

== Awards ==
- first prize in O Facho National Children's Literature Contest (Concurso nacional de contos infantís O Facho) in 1968, for his work A galiña azul.
- Winner in O Facho National Children's Theater Contest (Concurso Nacional de Teatro Infantil O Facho) in 1973, for his work As laranxas máis laranxas de todas as laranxas.
- Galaxia Award in 1975.
- Winner of the first Ramón Otero Pedrayo prize, in 1980, for his work Otero Pedrayo.

== See also ==
=== References ===
- Carlos Casares in Galician Encyclopaedia EGU (in Galician).
- Beckson, Karl E. (1998). The Oscar Wilde Encyclopedia. AMS Studies in the Nineteenth Century, no. 18. New York: AMS Press. ISBN 978-0-404-61498-0. Detailed reference work on Wilde, the majority of entries discuss his works; his biography, times, and contemporary literary movements are also covered.
- Loureiro, Ramón (2003). Carlos Casares. Vigo: Promocións Culturais Galegas / A Nosa Terra. ISBN 84-96203-51-4. (in Galician).
- Several authors (2004). Carlos Casares. Os amigos, as imaxes, as palabras. Vigo: Promocións Culturais Galegas / A Nosa Terra. ISBN 84-96403-20-3. (in Galician).
- Several authors (2003). Carlos Casares. Monografías. Revista de Estudios Miñoranos. Val Miñor: Instituto de Estudios Miñoranos. ISBN 84-8289-213-4. (in Galician).
- Henrique Monteagudo and Francisco Díaz Fierros (2003). Carlos Casares: a semente aquecida da palabra. Santiago de Compostela: Consello da Cultura Galega. ISBN 84-95415-68-2. (in Galician).

=== External links ===
- Biography in Biblioteca Virtual Galega, in Galician
- Biography in Consello da Cultura Galega, in Galician
- Author's description in AELG, in Galician.
- Carlos Casares Foundation (Fundación Carlos Casares)
- Biography in El Poder de la Palabra. In Spanish
