= Noia =

Coordinates: 42°47′N 8°53′W

- town
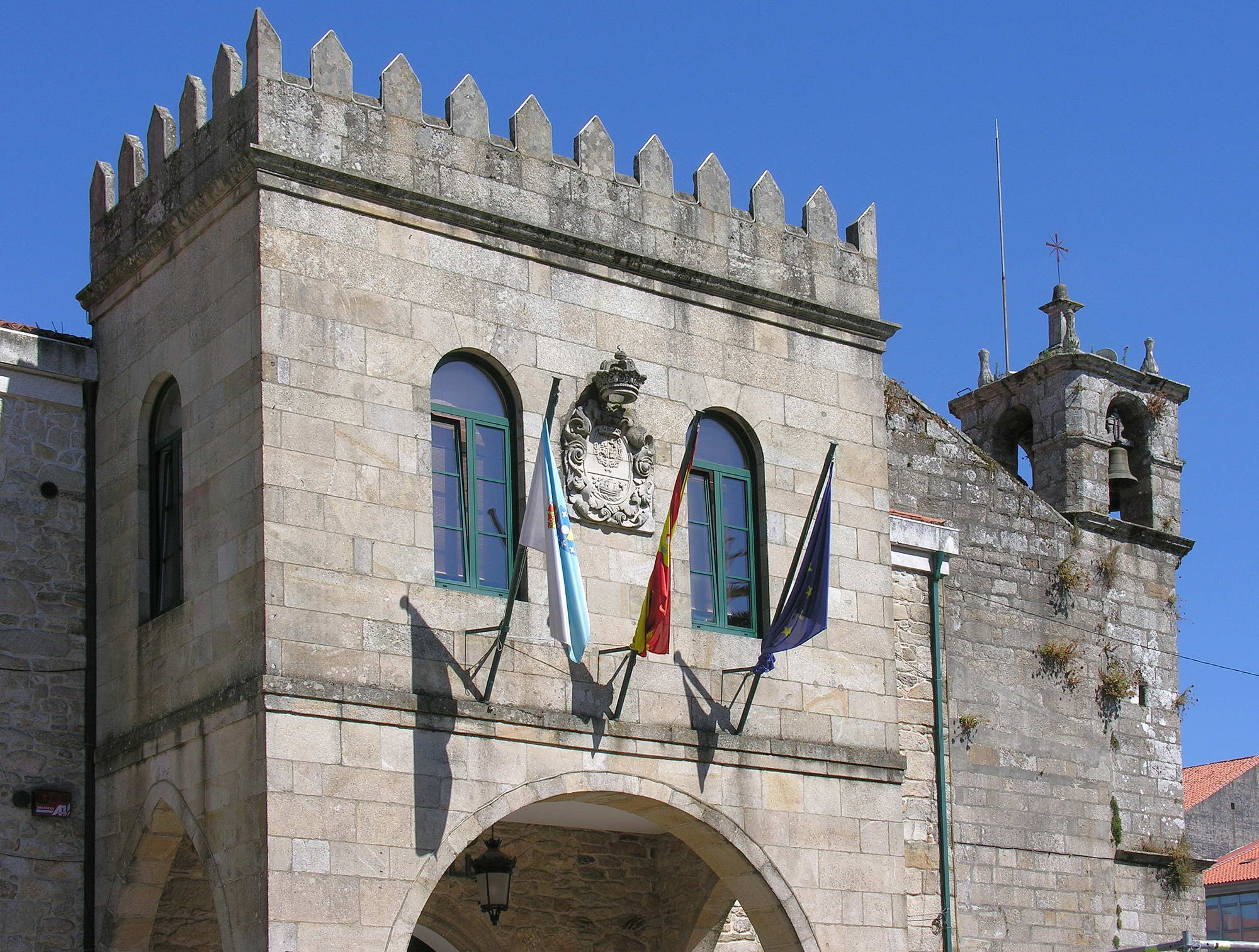

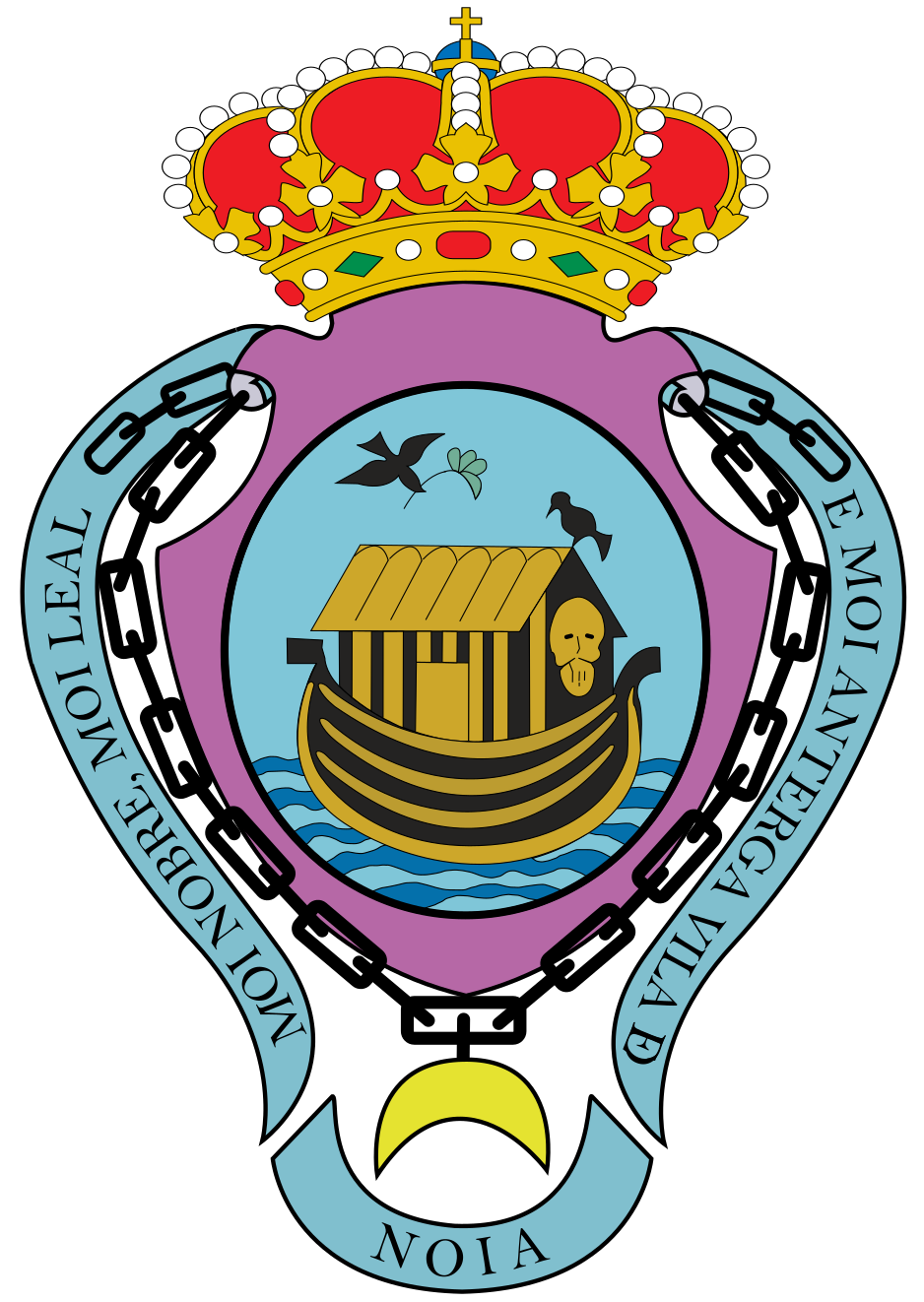
- Coat of arms

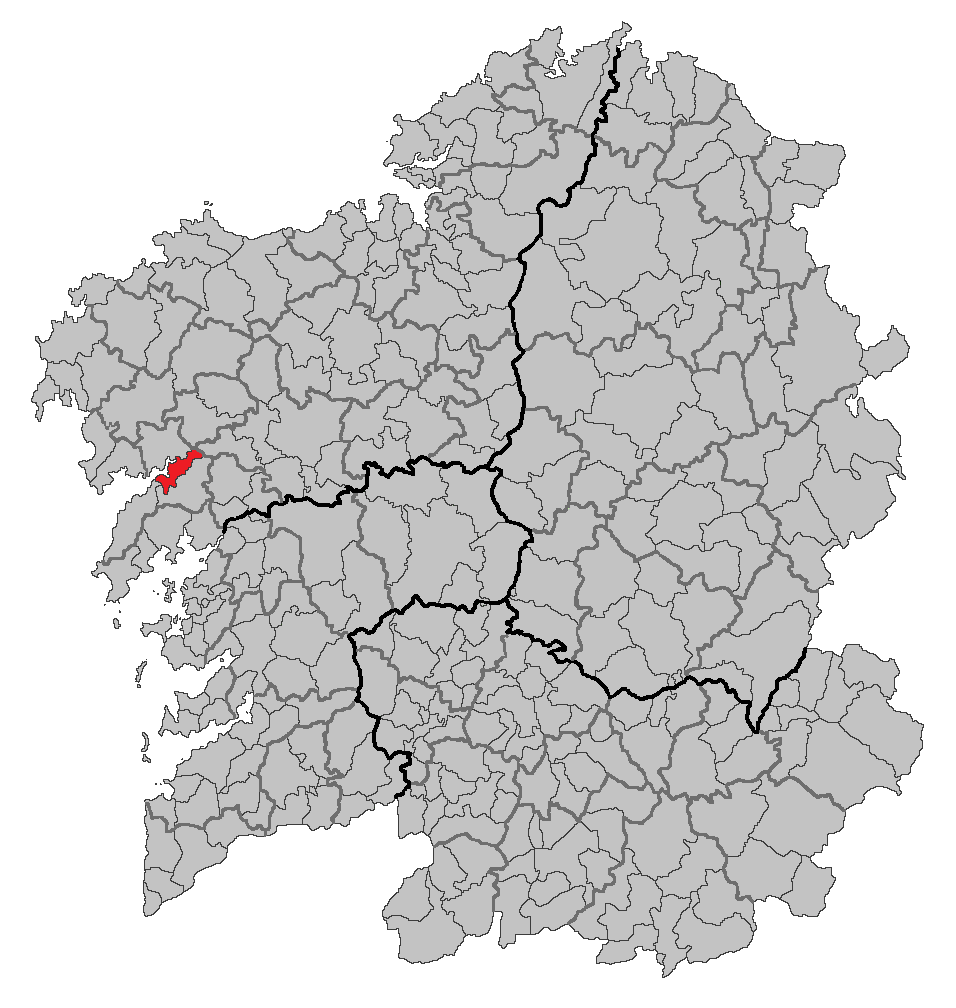
- Situation of Noia within Galicia

Population (2025-01-01)
  - Total: 14,123
- Time zone: UTC+1 (CET)
  - Summer (DST): UTC+2 (CEST)

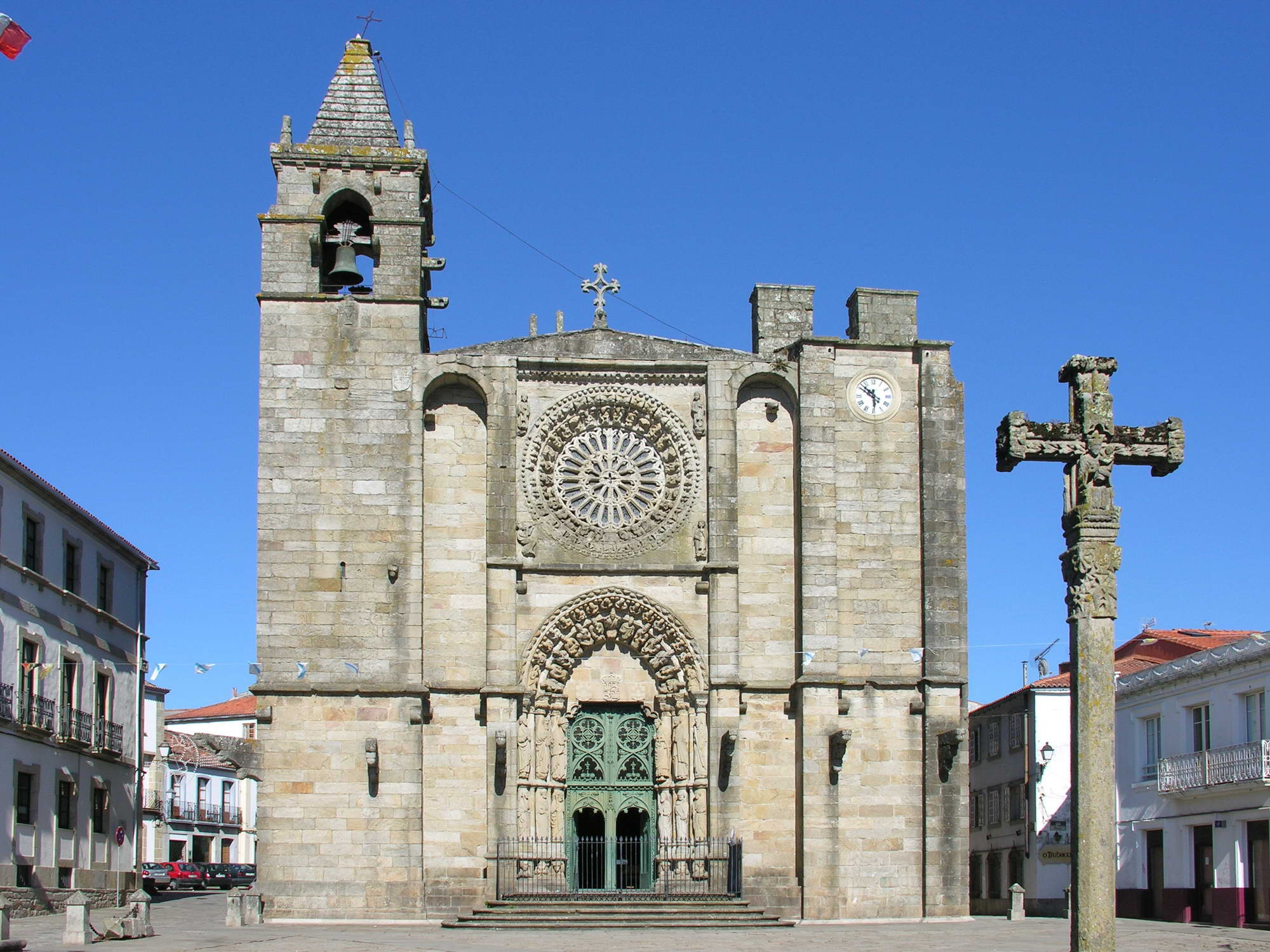
Church of Saint Martin

Noia (Galician pronunciation: [ˈnɔjɐ]) is a town and municipality in the autonomous community of Galicia in northwestern Spain. It is the capital of the comarca with the same name. It has a population of 14,947 inhabitants (2010), being situated in the Province of A Coruña, some 20 miles west of Santiago de Compostela near the mouth of the Tambre river.

Noia was a thriving commercial port during the Low Middle Ages, being at that time the third most important town of the bishopric of Santiago de Compostela, after the capital and the town of Pontevedra. From that era it had preserved a notable old quarter, with a series of late Romanesque churches.

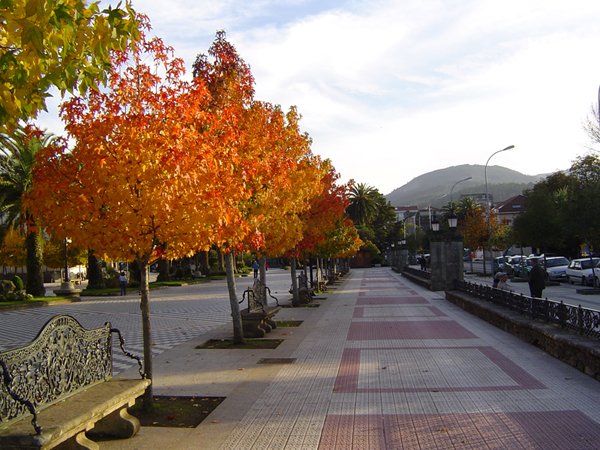
An image from Noia.

The "Dia das Letras Galegas" (Day of the Galician Writers) was celebrated in honour of Antón Avilés de Taramancos in 2003 and María Mariño Carou in 2007, both born in this town.

== Demography ==
From:INR Archiv

== See also ==
List of municipalities in A Coruña
