= Francisca Herrera Garrido =

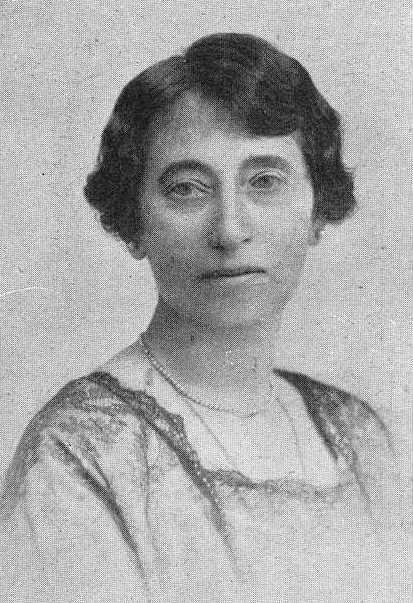
Francisca Herrera Garrido

Francisca Herrera Garrido (1869 – 4 November 1950) was a Galician writer of poems and novels.

== Biography ==
Born in La Coruña to a wealthy Galician aristocratic family, she lived in Madrid during most of her life. Though she wrote primarily in Galician, she also wrote in Spanish. A contemporary of Sofía Casanova, it was Rosalía de Castro who served as Herrera Garrido's literary model. Conservative and antifeminist, Herrera Garrido was "one of the first women to publish narrative in Galician". She was the first woman elected as a permanent member of the Royal Galician Academy, and was honored on Galician Literature Day in 1987.

== Selected works ==
- Sorrisas e bágoas, 1913
- Almas de muller...¡volallas na luz!, 1915
- Frores do noso paxareco, 1919
- Néveda, 1920
- A ialma de Mingos, 1922
- Pepiña, 1922
- Martes de Antroido, 1925
- Réproba, 1925
- A neta de naipera, 1925
- Familia de lobos, 1928
