= Manuel Antonio =

Galician poet

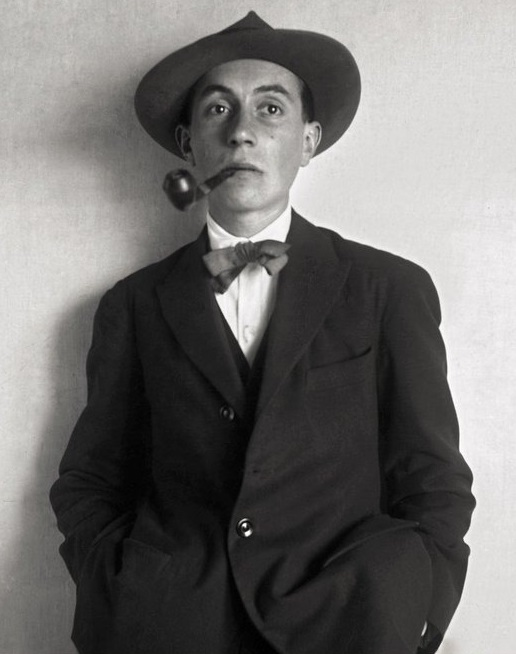
- Manuel Antonio.
- Born: July 12, 1900; Rianxo, Galicia, Spain
- Died: January 28, 1930 (aged 29); Asados, Rianxo, Galicia, Spain
- Occupation: Poet
- Writing career
- Genre: Poetry
- Literary movement: Creacionismo

Manuel Antonio Pérez Sánchez (July 12, 1900 – January 28, 1930), better known as Manuel Antonio, was a Galician poet. He was honoured on Galician Literature Day in 1979.
