= Luz Pozo Garza =

Spanish poet (1922–2020)

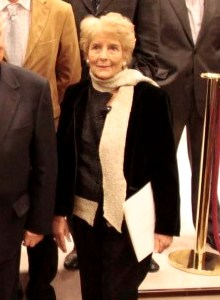
- Pozo Garza in 2013.
- Born: 21 July 1922; Ribadeo, Lugo, Spain
- Died: 20 April 2020 (aged 97); A Coruña, Spain
- Education: University of Oviedo
- Occupations: poet, essayist, literary critic
- Partners: Francisco Vázquez Ramudo (1944–1981); Eduardo Moreiras (1982–1991)
- Children: Gonzalo Vázquez Pozo
- Writing career
- Language: Spanish
- Notable awards: Castelao Medal (1995)

Luz Pozo Garza (Ribadeo, 21 July 1922 – A Coruña , 20 April 2020), was a Spanish poet and a member of the Royal Galician Academy.

== Biography ==
She began her studies in Ribadeo with the painter and sculptor, Prieto Coussent. At the age of fourteen, due to the Spanish Civil War and the persecution of her father, she moved with her family to Lugo and later to Larache (Spanish protectorate in Morocco). Back in Galicia, she settled in Viveiro. There, she carried out various musical studies that left a unique mark on her poetics. She also studied education and philology of Romanesque art.

Her first works were published in Las Riberas del Eo, Lana Noche, Poesía Española, Ínsula or Vida Gallega. Her mentor was Dionisio Gamallo Fierros.

Later, after settling in Vigo, she developed a long teaching career at the Nigrán as a teacher of Spanish language and literature in Secondary education, retiring in 1987. Between 1975 and 1976, she co-directed the magazine, Nordés with Tomás Barros Pardo. She also promoted the creation of the magazine, Clave Orión.

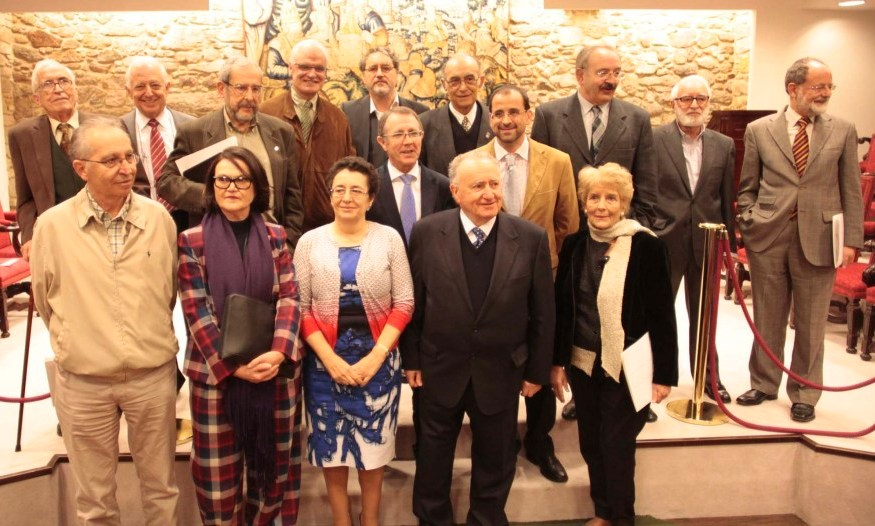
Plenary, Royal Galician Academy, April 2013. Luz Pozo Garza is standing in the front row, far right.

Pozo Garza was a member of the Royal Galician Academy since 29 November 1996. Her first speech was entitled Diálogos con Rosalía.

Pozo Garza was, according to Rosario Álvarez Blanco an illustrious voice in poetry since the publication of her first collection of poems in Galician, El pájaro en la boca (1952), which inaugurated the Xistral collection. In her later work, Luz Pozo expressed a poetry charged with sensuality and depth, in which love, existential concern, homeland, freedom and even death intersect, composing texts of authenticity and maturity.

== Legacy ==
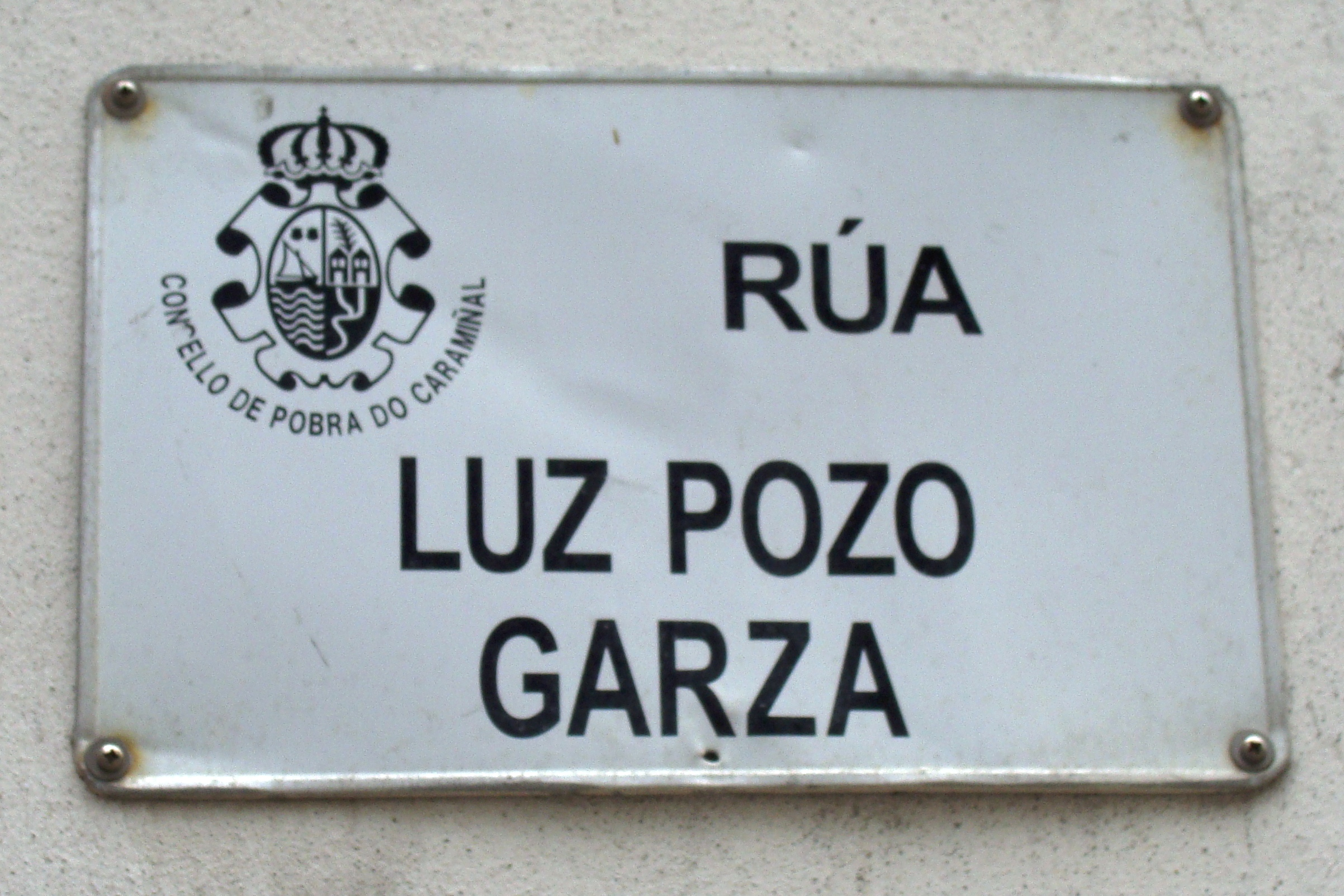
Rua Luz Pozo Garza

In 2001, Pozo Garza was nominated as an honorary member of the Galician Language Writers Association (letter Y). Next, the "Tribute to the writer in her land" was celebrated with her in Ribadeo, with a poem that she selected from the book Vida secreta de Rosalía. That same year, Ribadeo dedicated a street to her. Likewise, there are dedicated streets in her name in the municipalities of Culleredo (in El Burgo) and in La Coruña.

In 2018, her name was given to the Viveiro Language School and Viveiro honored her as an adoptive daughter.

On January 18, 2020, she was named Ribadeo's "favorite daughter", at the proposal by the Councilor for Culture, Pilar Otero Cabarcos.

== Awards and honours ==
- Premio a la Creación Femenina de la Consejería de Educación, Universidad y Formación Profesional de la Junta de Galicia (1991), for her entire literary career.
- Premio Celanova Casa de los Poetas (2001).
- Premio Miguel González Garcés (1992), for Prometo la flor de loto.
- Premio de la Crítica de poesía gallega (2009), for Detener el día con una flor.
- Premio Cultura Gallega de las Letras de la Junta de Galicia (2013).
- Premio Laxeiro (2014).
- Premio Trasalba of the Fundación Otero Pedrayo (2019).

== Selected works ==
=== Poetry in Galician ===
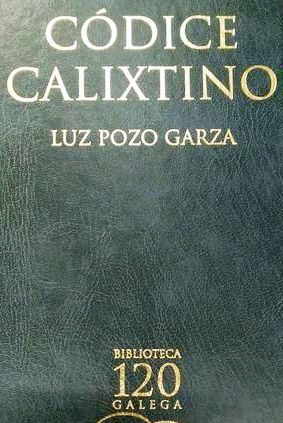
Códice Calixtino

- O paxaro na boca, 1952, Colección Xistral.
- Últimas palabras / Verbas derradeiras, 1976, La Coruña: Nordés. Self-translated Galician version of the original in Spanish.
- Concerto de outono, 1981, Ediciós do Castro.
- Códice calixtino, 1986, Sotelo Blanco.
- Prometo a flor de loto, 1992, Provincial Council of La Coruña.
- Vida secreta de Rosalía, 1996, Espiral Maior.
- Ribadeo, Ribadeo, 2002, Junta de Galicia.
- Medea en Corinto, 2003, Linteo, bilingual Galician-Spanish edition.
- Historias fidelísimas: poesía selecta 1952-2003, 2003, PEN Club Galicia.
- Memoria solar (complete poetic work), 2004, Linteo.
- As arpas de Iwerddon, 2005, Linteo.
- As vodas palatinas, 2005, Espiral Maior.
- Deter o día cunha flor, 2009, Baía Edicións; with illustrations by José Valentín.
- Rosa tántrica, 2016, Alvarellos Editora.

=== Poetry in Spanish ===
- Ánfora, 1948, Vigo.
- El vagabundo, 1952, Ribadeo.
- Cita en el viento, 1962, Viveiro.
- Últimas palabras / Verbas derradeiras, 1976. La Coruña: Noreste.
- Sol de medianoche, 2013, Eurisaces.
