= Luís Pimentel =

Galician poet (1895-1958)

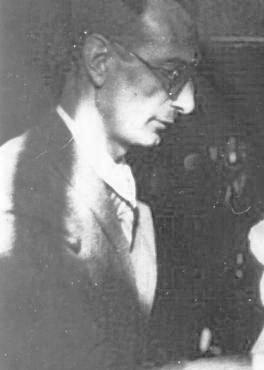
- Born: Luís Benigno Vázquez Fernández-Pimentel; 18 December 1895; Lugo, Galicia, Kingdom of Spain
- Died: 13 February 1958 (aged 62); Lugo, Galicia, Spanish State
- Education: University of Santiago de Compostela
- Occupations: Physician, poet
- Spouse: Pilar Cayón Fernández
- Children: 1
- Relatives: Carlos Vázquez Pimentel (brother); José Vázquez Fernández-Pimentel (brother); María Mercedes V. Fernández-Pimentel (sister)
- Writing career
- Language: Spanish and Galician
- Genre: Poetry

Signature
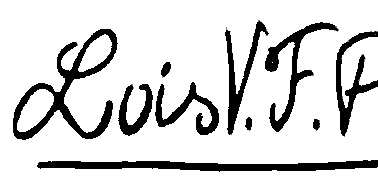

Luís Vázquez Fernández-Pimentel (b. Lugo, 18 December 1895 – d. Lugo, 13 February 1958) was a Galician poet.

Galician Literature Day is dedicated to him in 1990.

== Work ==
- Triscos (1950). Colección Benito Soto (in Galician).
- Sombra do aire na herba (1959). Galaxia (in Galician).
- Barco sin luces (1960) (in Spanish).
- Poesía enteira (1981). Edicións Xerais de Galicia.
- Luis Pimentel. Obra inédita o no recopilada (1981). Celta.
- Poesía galega (1989). Edicións Xerais de Galicia.
- Poesías completas, de Luís Pimentel (1990). Comares.
- Luís Pimentel. Obra completa (2009). Galaxia.

== Bibliography ==
- Agustín Fernández, S. (2007). "Luis Pimentel, poeta del abismo interior". Madrygal (10): 35–43. ISSN 1138-9664.
- Alonso Montero, X. (1990). Luís Pimentel, biografía da súa poesía. Do Cumio. ISBN 978-84-87126-19-2.
- Blanco, C. (2005). Extranjera en su patria. Cuatro poetas gallegos. Rosalía de Castro, Manuel Antonio, Luís Pimentel, Luz Pozo Garza. Círculo de Lectores / Galaxia Gutenberg. ISBN 978-84-8109-565-4.
- Carballo Calero, R. (1978). "Originales inéditos en castellano de poemas de Luis Pimentel publicados en gallego". 1916. Anuario de la Sociedad Española de Literatura General y Comparada (1): 68–83.
- —————— (1980). "Sobre la poesía de Luis Pimentel". 1916. Anuario de la Sociedad Española de Literatura General y Comparada (3): 41–50.
- Fernández de la Vega, C. (1983). "Vida e poesía de Luís Pimentel". Sombra do aire na herba. BBdCG. Galaxia.
- Fernández del Riego, F. (1971) [1951]. Historia da literatura galega (2ª ed.). Galaxia. pp. 221–223.
- —————— (1990). Diccionario de escritores en lingua galega. Do Castro. p. 450. ISBN 978-84-7492-465-7.
- Fernández Rodríguez, Manuel, ed. (2006). Poemas pola memoria. 1936-2006. Xunta de Galicia.
- García, J., ed. (2001). Poetas del Novecientos: entre el Modernismo y la Vanguardia: (Antología). Tomo I: De Fernando Fortún a Rafael Porlán. BSCH. pp. 182–201. ISBN 978-84-89913-26-4.
- Gómez, A.; Queixas, M. (2001). Historia xeral da literatura galega. A Nosa Terra. p. 205-206. ISBN 84-95350-79-3.
- Herrero Figueroa, A. (1991). "Luis Pimentel, poeta hispánico". Turia (16): 123–146. ISSN 0213-4373.
- —————— (1994). Sobre Luís Pimentel, Álvaro Cunqueiro e Carballo Calero: apontamentos de Filoloxía, Crítica e Didáctica da Literatura. Do Castro. ISBN 84-7492-721-8.
- —————— (2007). Unha cidade e un poeta (Lugo e Luís Pimentel). Deputación. ISBN 978-84-8192-382-7.
- López-Casanova, A. (1990). Luís Pimentel e Sombra do aire na herba. Ágora. Galaxia. ISBN 84-7154-716-3.
- Méndez Ferrín, X. L. (1984). De Pondal a Novoneyra. Xerais. pp. 52, 306. ISBN 84-7507-139-2.
- Pallarés, P. (1991). Rosas na sombra (a poesía de Luís Pimentel). Do Cumio. ISBN 84-87126-28-6.
- Piñeiro, R. (1958). "Luis Pimentel". Boletín da RAG (327-332): 180-183. ISSN 1576-8767.
- Piñeiro, Pozo, López-Casanova, Rodriguez and Murado (1990). Luís Pimentel, unha fotobiografía. Xerais. ISBN 84-7507-280-1.
- Sánchez Reboredo, J. (1989). El silencio y la música (Ensayo sobre la poesía de Pimentel) (en español). ISBN 84-505-8829-4.
- Vilavedra, D., ed. (1995). "Vázquez Fernández, Luís". Diccionario da Literatura Galega. I. Autores. Galaxia. pp. 597–599. ISBN 84-8288-019-5.
