= María Mariño =

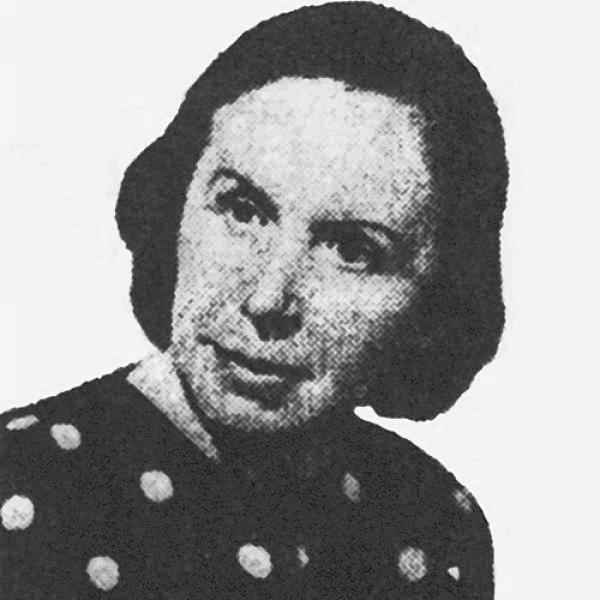
- Born: María Mariño Carou; 8 June 1907; Noia (A Coruña), Spain
- Died: 19 May 1967 (aged 59); Folgoso do Courel (Lugo), Spain
- Citizenship: Spanish
- Writing career
- Language: Galician, Spanish

María Mariño Carou (1907–1967) was a Galician writer. She was born on 8 June 1907 in a house on Rúa Cega in Noia, A Coruña province. She was the daughter of Xosé Mariño Pais, a shoe maker. She was the fourth of five children. Her siblings were Concha (1898), Emilio (1901), Cándido (1902) and Asunción (1908). She had to leave school in order to work, because her father used to gamble in the taverns of Noia. Whilst Emilio found work as a mechanic and Cándido as a carpenter, María and her sisters helped out in domestic tasks. On 31 May 1939 Mariño Carou married Roberto Pose Carballido and also began to lie about her age. She died of leukaemia on 19 May 1967, just before her sixtieth birthday.

In 1963 she published "Palabra no Tempo", arguably her best work.

== Works ==
- 1963 - "Palabra no Tempo"
- 1990 - "Verba que comenza"
