= Cova Céltica =

A Cova Céltica (The Celtic Cave in English) was the name given to a discussion group held by a group of Galician intellectuals, with a regionalist ideology, who met in Eugenio Carré Aldao's bookshop to discuss issues related to Galicia. A Cova Céltica was one of the many cultural expressions of the cultural movement known as the Rexurdimento (Resurgence in English), which emerged in the mid 1800s and which revitalized the culture of Galicia. The Rexurdimento movement was sparked by the publication of works in the Galician language by authors such as Valentín Lamas Carvajal, Manuel Murguía and Rosalía de Castro.
