= Evaristo Martelo Paumán =

Spanish aristocrat, writer and politician

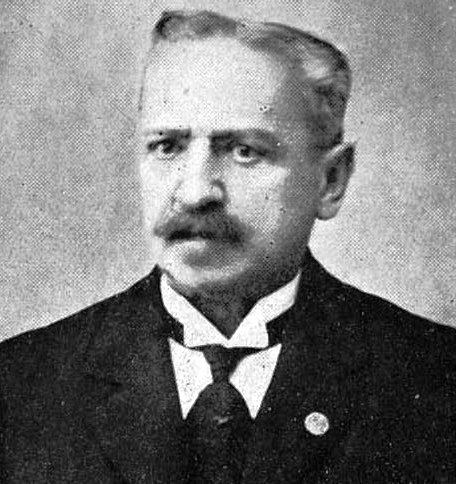
- Born: 1850; La Coruña, Spain
- Died: 1928; La Coruña, Spain
- Occupation: landowner
- Known for: poet
- Political party: Carlism

Evaristo Martelo y Paumán del Nero Nuñez y Zuazo-Mondragón, 6th Marquess of Almeiras (1850–1928), was a Spanish aristocrat, writer and politician. He is known chiefly as a poet who contributed to emergence of the literary Galician and who is counted among protagonists of the so-called Rexurdimento. He perceived galego as a royal language of ancient rulers, framed in the Celtic mythology, and opposed the concept of Galician as a rural folk speak. Martelo engaged in few organisations related to the Galician culture and was a member of the Royal Galician Academy. Politically he supported the Traditionalist cause and served as leader of the Carlist provincial organisation in La Coruña; he has never engaged in building up Galician nationalism.

== Family and youth ==
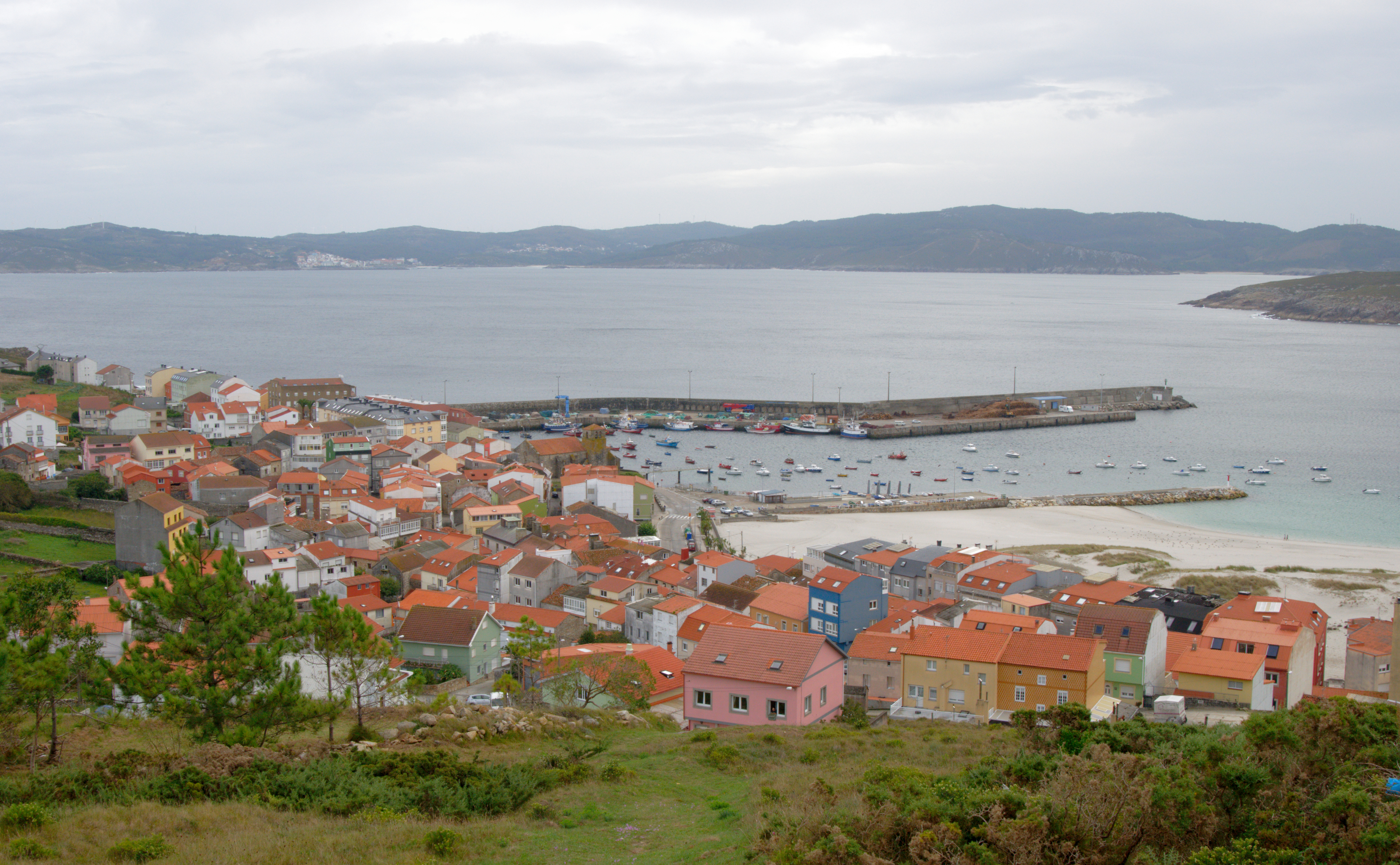
Laxe (Casa do Arco bottom-left)

Martelo descended from numerous old Galician families, though more prestigious were lines of his maternal ancestors. The Martelos originated from France; the paternal grandfather, Luis Martelo de Lema Núñez, was a Laxe landowner and holder of various local official jobs. The paternal grandmother, Josefa Núñez Romero, along the Moscoso line was related to a 15th-century knight Conde de Altamira. The maternal grandfather Juan Paumán del Nero married Mariana Zuazo Fajardo; her father Antonio Zuazo de Mondragón y Rendón was regidor perpetuo of La Coruña. In 1780 Carlos III made him Marqués de Almeiras; he claimed also the title of Vizconde de Andeiro. Her mother was heiress to the Fajardos, landowners of Rianxo; she was distantly related to "caballero y poeta de la mar océana" Paio Gómez Chariño and to Condes de Traba.

Evaristo's father Ramón Martelo Núñez de Leys Romero y de Moscoso (1804-1873) was a military and magistrado; he served as Jefe Político of La Coruña province in the 1840s and as deputy to the Cortes in 1854–1856. The mother, María Dolores Paumán de Nero Zuazo de Andrade Fajardo y Sotomayor (1815-1850), died 6 days after giving birth to their only child. Since his father did not remarry, Evaristo was growing as the only heir to numerous estates scattered across Galicia; they included "Casa do Pombal" in Boaño, "O Chariñó" or "Casa de Faxardo" - later to be known as "Pazo do Martelo" – in Rianxo, "Casa do Arco" in Laxe, "Solar dos Andeiro" in Cambre, "Palacio de Almeiras" in La Coruña and especially Castillo de Vimianzo.

Evaristo spent his early childhood between Laxe, Rianxo and Vimianzo. In 1862-1868 he frequented Insituto Local de Segunda Enseñanza in La Coruña and Santiago de Compostela, obtaining bachillerato in arts in 1868. The same year he entered the navy academy in Ferrol, but having been promoted to guardiamarina he abandoned military career. He then enrolled at law in Santiago; however, following death of his father, in the early 1870s he left the university to take care of the family economy. He would complete the academic education in 1888–1889, when he majored in law.

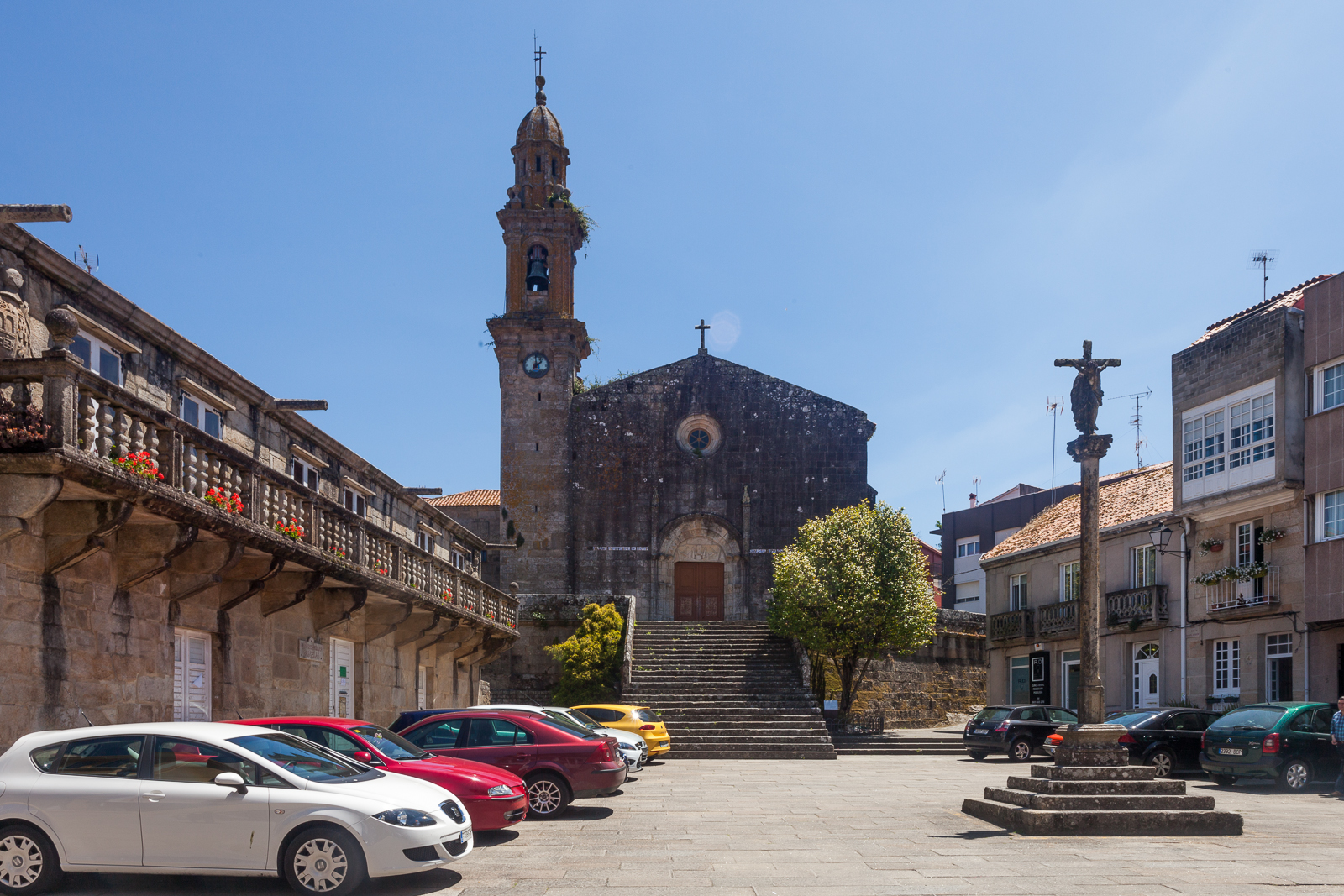
Pazo do Martelo in Rianxo (left)

In 1873 Martelo married Josefa de la Maza y Agar (1852-1932), daughter of the Pontevedra diputación president Ramón de la Maza y Quiroga, by her mother Petra de Agar y Roldán related to Conde de Tablada. The coupled lived on numerous family estates, during cold season in their houses in La Coruña, and during summers in the Vimianzo castle. They had 3 children, born between 1874 and 1880; the youngest son died at 2 years of age, while the other two, Dolores and Ramón Martelo y de la Maza Paumán del Nero y Agar, did not become public figures. It was neither the case of his grandchildren; among the great-grandchildren the best known is a lawyer Marcial Martelo de la Maza García. He is also the current holder of marquesado de Almeiras, the title claimed by and confirmed to Martelo in 1920.

== Writer ==
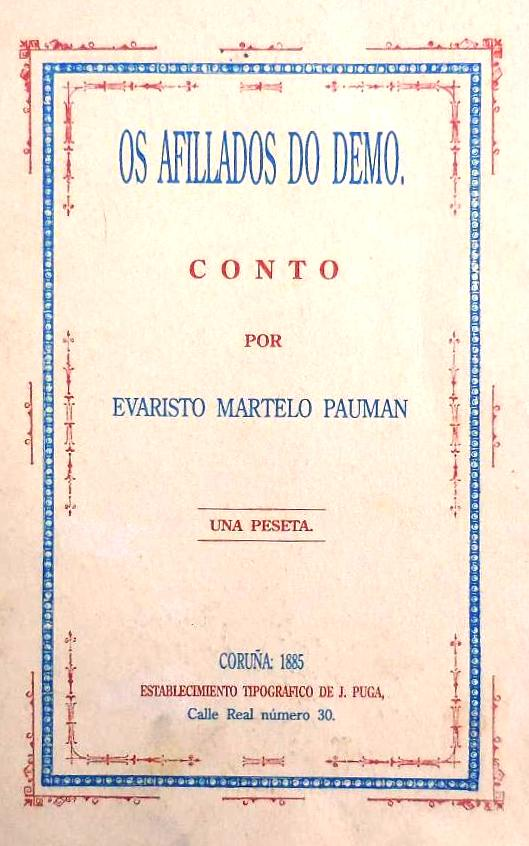
Os afillados do demo

Martelo is best known as a poet. He published 6 volumes: Poesías líricas (1871, in Spanish), Os afiliados do demo (1885, in Galician), Líricas gallegas (1894, in Galician), El siglo XX. Cuatro verdades (1902, in Spanish), Landras e bayas (1919, in Galician) and Andeiro, poema histórico brigantino da Unión Ibérica (1922, in Galician). Since he started writing to periodicals already as a child his earliest poetic contributions might not be identified; his signed writings appeared in local press throughout 40 years, scattered across titles like Galicia, Santiago, Follas Novas, Coruña Moderna, Boletín Oficial del Centro Gallego, Revista Gallega, El Ideal Gallego or El Compostelano. Martelo fathered also one drama in Galician, Rentar de Castromil, actually staged in La Coruña in 1904, few articles, and 2 juridical manuals. Some of his poems remained in manuscripts.

A contemporary scholar identifies 6 major threads of Martelo's poetry. His intimate verses were mostly reflections on family, life, love, and happiness. Social and patriotic poems revolved around defense of foral rights, social solidarity, traditional values, and Carlism, often explicitly aimed against Liberalism and homogeneity, promoted from Madrid. Works falling into the "costumista-realista" rubric are exaltation or rural life and customs, pitted against advancing urbanization and change which dismantles the old agrarian order. Writings adhering to the satirical tone target those who promoted crude and vulgar Galician dialects and form part of Martelo's voice in discussion on the role and future of Galician language. Homages to nobility and related aristocratic virtues form a separate thread on its own. Finally, historicist poetry advances narratives set in the regional past, often heavily embroiled in the Celtic mythology.

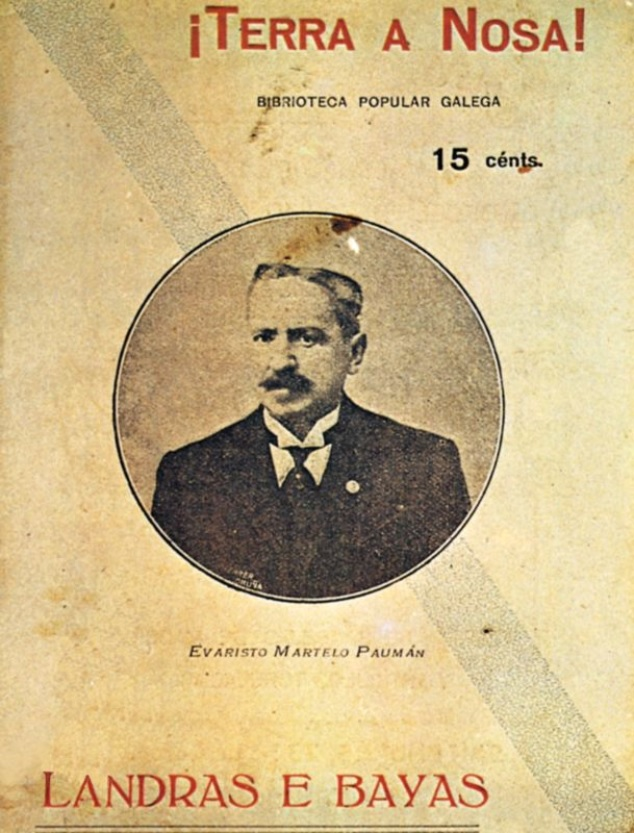
Landras e bayas

Martelo's poetry adhered to numerous formats: from sonnets to epigrams, odes, narrative poems and satires, though he is appreciated mostly due to his lyrical verses. As a poet – considered "not very prolific" - he was inspired mostly by Pondal and is referred to as "continuador da estética pondaliana", with Celtic mythology and heroic Galego past singled out as 2 key motives of his poetry. Some scholars place him within the tradition of "bardismo, Ossián, celtismo", other focus on aristocratic and patriotic spirit and name him rather a "hidalgo idealista", few call him "poeta de la Tradición" and underline the Carlist motives. Historian of Galician literature claims that he was a late minstrel of patriarchal, rural, Traditionalist Galicia, part of a wider Iberic rather than a Spanish community; his aim was to hail the glorious past and enrich the Galician personality. Linked to minor local groups Escola Corunesa and Escola Formalista, in terms of style Martelo's poetry is deemed related to symbolism and especially Saudosismo, in his case considered to be a specific expression of literary regenerationism; when discussed against a broad poetic background, he is placed in-between Saudosismo and Generación 98.

== Theorist, activist and official ==
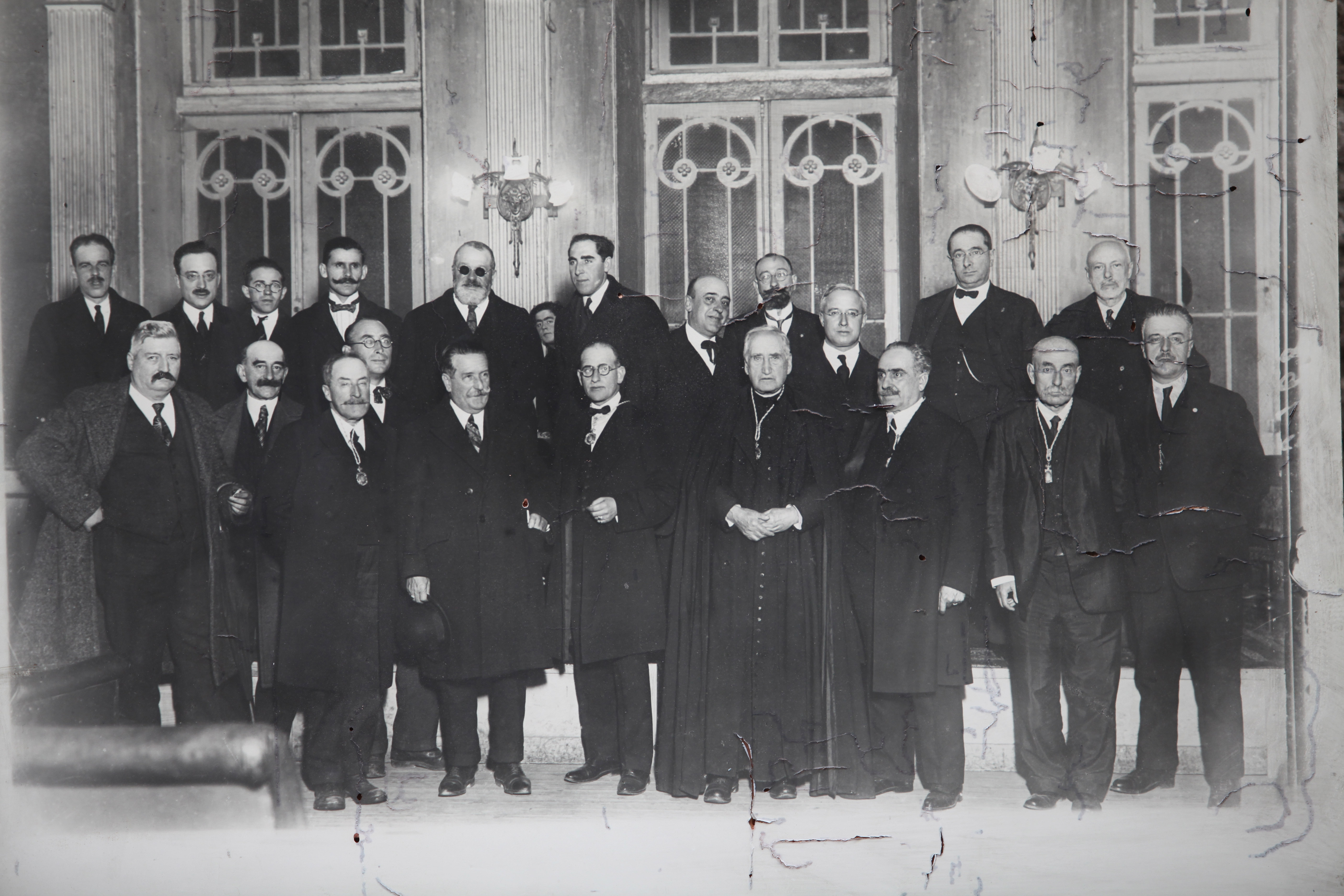
Martelo during RAG session

Martelo was a protagonist of rexurdimento galego also as a theorist; he published few articles on linguistic and related issues. He formed part of the so-called "cultistas", the group which approached Galician as a royal language of local ancient rulers; it opposed the so-called "popularistas", who saw Galician as common speak of the folk. In favor of development of standard language, he supported the academy-driven codification against elevating spoken dialects to standard and promoted "gallego bergantiñan depurado de vulgarismos". He opposed neologisms and incursions from Spanish or Portuguese alike, though he also used to introduce own linguistic inventions, reportedly re-discovered from the ancient vocabulary.

Since 1893 Martelo engaged in A Cova Céltica, an informal La Coruña group of intellectuals striving to build a lettered Galician culture. He befriended numerous galleguistas, especially Manuel Murguía and Eduardo Pondal; some became his "círculo habitual". He was briefly committed to emergence of Liga Gallega. In the early 1900s he collaborated with the Cova-sponsored Escola Rexional de Declamación, though he also tried to animate literary life beyond its circles. When Real Academia Gallega was constituted in 1906, Martelo contributed to drafting of its rules and became its member-correspondent. Since the late 1910s he was considered a candidate to become its academico numerario, and indeed in 1921 he entered RAG with a lecture on Pondal.

During almost 50 years Martelo in a few strings served in the La Coruña ayuntamiento, e.g. noted in the late 1870s, late 1900s or early 1920s; periodically holding the post of segundo sindico, he was particularly involved in works of the infrastructure commission. Following the coup of Primo de Rivera he resigned, but as corporative appointee re-entered the town hall in 1924. He presided over some city-controlled companies, like the local insurance society. For some 30 years Martelo was a member of Consejo Provincial de Agricultura, Industria y Comercio, first noted in 1883 and last recorded in 1911; in the 1890s he served as president of the body; periodically he took part in works of other provincial institutions, e.g. Junta Provincial de Instrucción Pública. Finally, he acted as adjunto in the provincial Tribunal de Justicia.

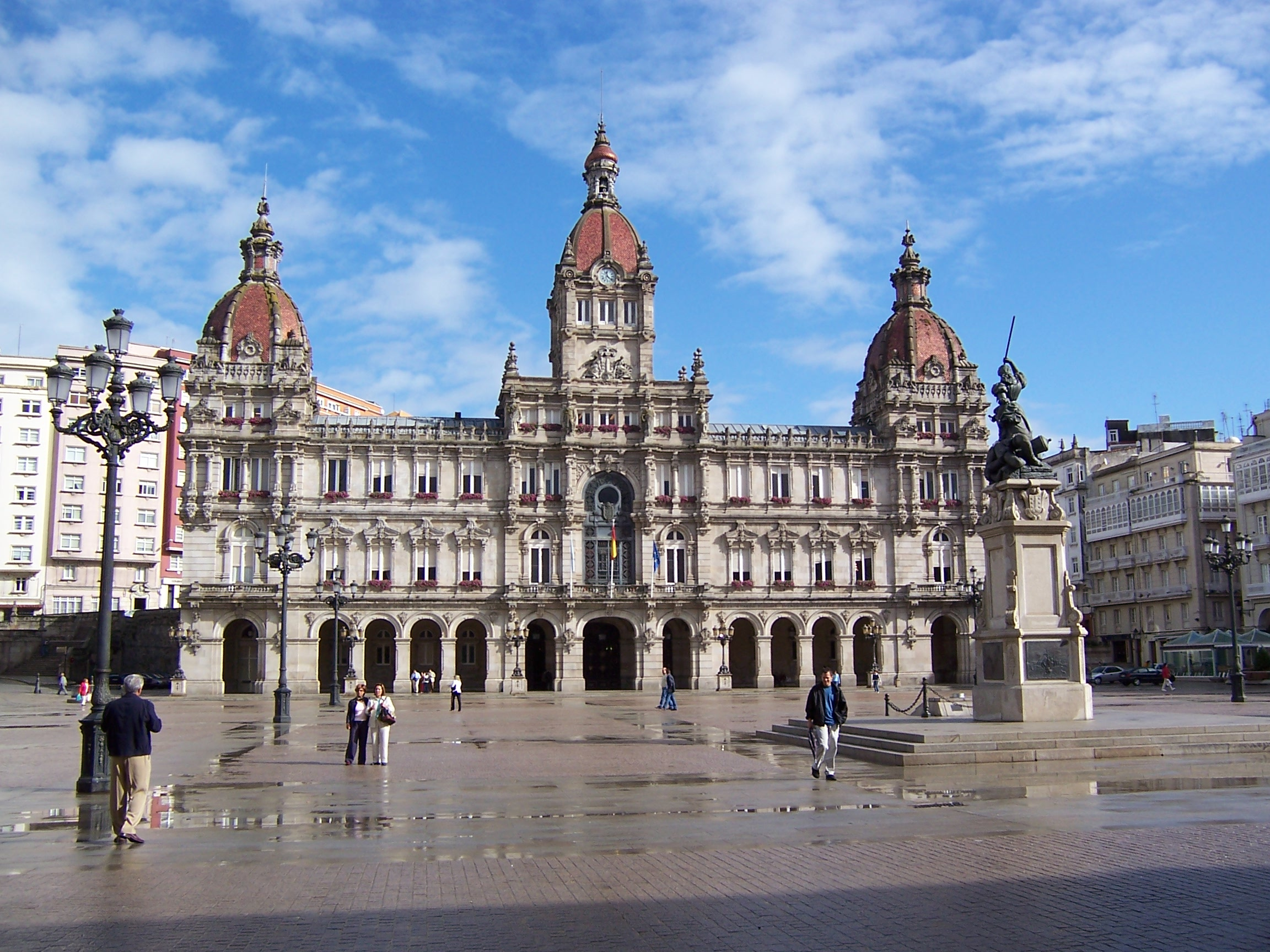
La Coruna town hall

Apart from his roles in galleguista organisations and official administration, Martelo engaged also in numerous other institutions. Since the late 1870s he was a member of Asociación Internacional de Socorro an Enfermos and acted as Caballero de Número Hospitalario de San Juan. Since the 1880s he was socio correspondente of Sociedad Económica de Amigos del País and since the 1890s he acted as honorary president of Círculo Católico de Obreros de Galicia. Another Catholic institution he animated was the local Círculo de Recreo in La Coruña, though there is some unclarity as to his relations with the hierarchy. In the 1880s the archbishop nominated Martelo to supervise orthodoxy of provincial prints and in the 1900s he welcomed hierarchs at his private premises, but some press notes from the 1920s hint at his anti-clericalism.

== Carlist ==
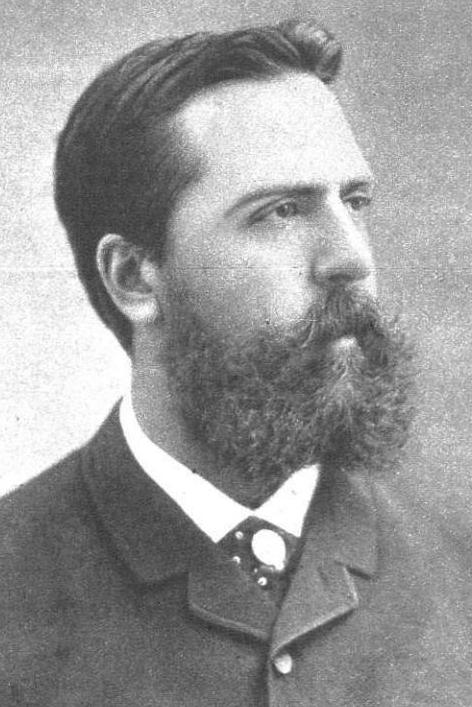
Carlos VII, early 1870s

Since Martelo's father was a militant Liberal it is not clear how he approached the Traditionalists, especially that except Orense, the movement was not particularly strong in Galicia. Martelo declared himself the supporter of Carlos VII during the academic period; he engaged against Amadeo di Savoia, possibly taking part in local riots, and spoke in favor of the "legitimate dynasty". Though he abandoned the university around 1872, no author suggests he left to join the Traditionalists during the Third Carlist War. There is neither any information on Martelo's legitimist engagements during the following 3 decades. It is known that in the late 1880s and the early 1890s he was active in the La Coruña branch of Partido Liberal-Conservador and acted as its secretary; as a Conservative in 1893 he entered the ayuntamiento.

In the 1900s Martelo assumed an openly Carlist political stand, e.g. donating money to the cause or signing protest letters. In 1911 he was first noted as member of Junta Provincial of the Jaimista organization; two years later he grew to vice-president of the provincial structures, the position he held at least until 1915. In 1916 he was first recorded as Jefe Provincial; the last such reference identified comes from 1918. During his term in the provincial party executive Martelo engaged in typical leadership activities: he took part in local celebrations like Fiesta de los Martires de la Tradición, animated popular initiatives against secular and centralizing governmental projects like the so-called Ley del Candado, with other party pundits like Luis Hernando de Larramendi presided over rallies protesting further plans of liberal education and held honorary presidency of various provincial Traditionalist organizations, including the football section of Requeté Herculino. During the Mellista crisis of 1919 Martelo sided with the claimant Don Jaime and did not join the breakaways followers of Vázquez de Mella. In the early 1920s he still proudly boasted of his Jaimista identity. There is no information on any of his later would-be engagements.

Carlist standard

Martelo has never grown beyond the role of provincial leader and was not noted in nationwide politics. General historiographic studies on Traditionalism of the late 19th/early 20th century ignore him, though he is listed as representative of "el carlismo ideológico" in work on the Galician Carlism. Scholars claim that for Martelo Traditionalism was sort of extension of his idealistic, historicist, aristocratic and regionalist outlook, "not an esthetic refuge but an heroic ideal". His Carlism is reportedly best embodied in poems, which "expresan un modo de vivir, de pensar y de esperar, que es el modo de ser carlista"; the one which stands out as the most emblematic is Himno Militar Gallego Carlista, written in 1919. Though some of his poems honor "rebelión del pueblo gallego contra la opresión castellana", his vehement regionalism and exaltation of local fueros have never evolved into Galician nationalism. The unique feature of his Traditionalist outlook was Iberism; Martelo declared that Braga forms part of the fatherland just as much as Toledo does.

== Reception and legacy ==
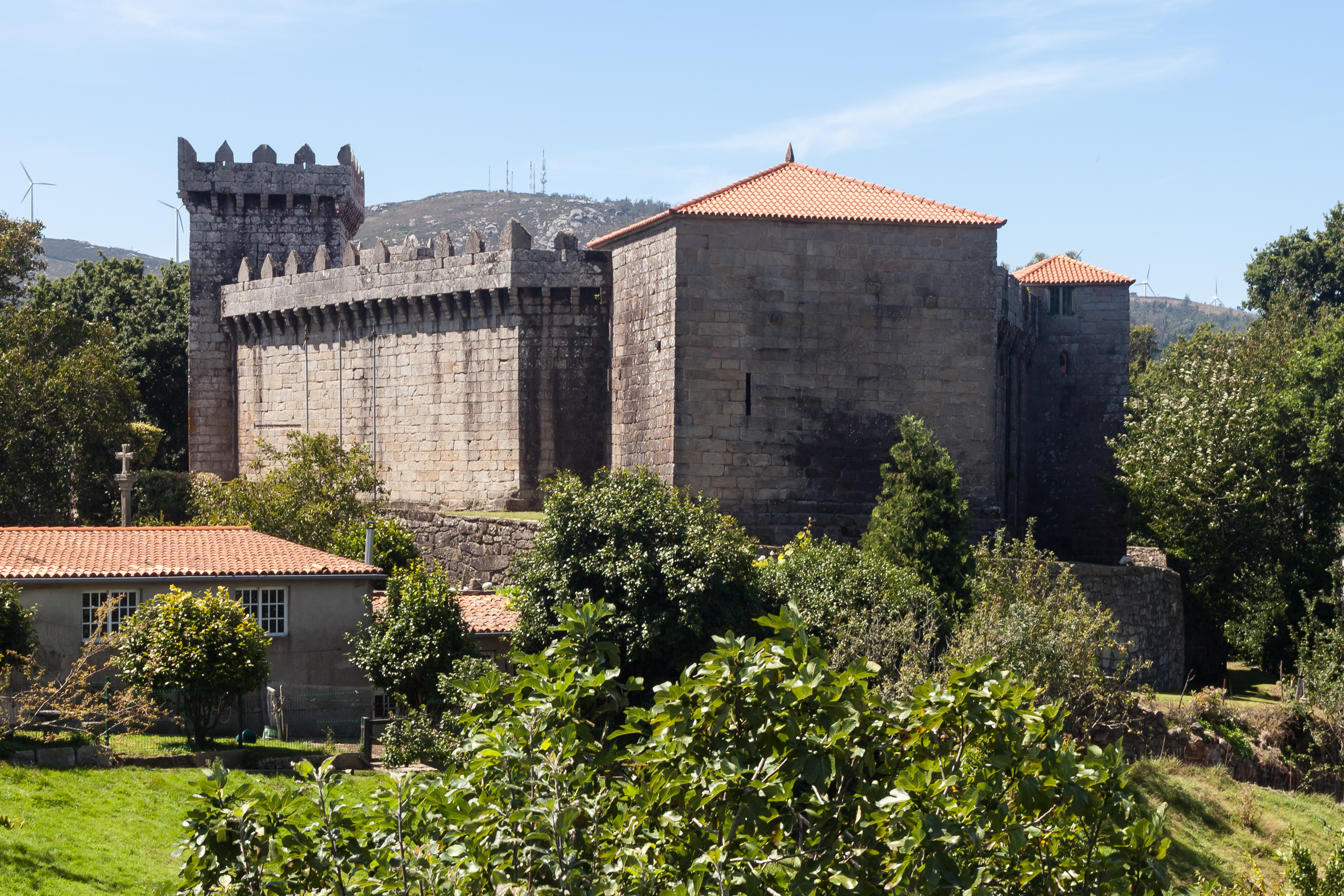
Vimianzo castle

Since the late 1880s Martelo was sporadically acknowledged in local provincial or even regional press as "notable escritor", "inspirado poeta" or "admirado poeta gallego", earning a few homage articles. His 1921 entry to Real Academia Gallega elevated him to the status of official authority on Galician language, but it was hardly recognized beyond his native region and even in La Coruña press he was presented as a bit of an eccentric. Except periodicals focused on aristocracy, his death was noted only in local press; Boletín de la Real Academia Gallega dedicated him a brief necrological piece which noted departure of "uno de los poetas que han manejado con mayor soltura y elegancia el léxico regional; uno de los gallegos de más fervoroso amor por la tierra nativa".

Following death Martelo mostly went into oblivion. Rarely some of his poems got re-published in the press; he was dedicated sub-chapters in a 1944 work on Galician Traditionalism and in a 1957 anthology of poesía gallega; in the 1950s Centro Gallego in Madrid organized a commemorative poetry session. In 1967 he earned few pages in the in-depth synthesis of history of the Galician literature and in the mid-1970s he was noted in few paragraphs of a study on Galician Carlism. Since the 1980s he is usually acknowledged in galleguista works, appropriate mentions ranging from few lines to a few pages. In 2004 he earned a PhD thesis, in 2013 re-sized to a monographic article.

Historians see Martelo as an important, though rather not a first-rate contributor to Galician literature. Some recognized him as "un dos máis inspirados e correitos poetos galegos", others prefer to credit him for the first drama and the first satire ever written in Galician. Many note his non-tangible contribution to rexurdimento galego, namely this of the Cova Céltica intellectual who inspired other writers. His poetic style is praised for charm, "unha unérxica dicción" and sincerity, though criticized for "somewhat licentious versification", "missing sense of form", abuse of conversational tone and "lira de seco e duro cordaxe". However, it seems agreed that he has earned "relevant place in history of the Galician literature".

In popular discourse Martelo is occasionally noted in Galician or Carlist cyberspace. There are streets named after him in Culleredo and Vimianzo. In 2001 his great-grandson organized a commemorative literary evening. In 2014 the Galician authorities co-funded publication of his poetic anthology, which in turn triggered a few press articles. Most of Martelo's numerous estates have changed hands since his death. The most iconic one, his preferred summer residence Castillo de Vimianzo, following changing fortunes is currently the property of local ayuntamiento, which turned it into a tourist attraction; the municipal authorities use it as the setting for "Noite no Castelo", a nightly event which includes reading of Martelo's poetry. Some of his papers are stored in the regional Galician archive.

== See also ==
- Carlism
- Rexurdimento
- Castelo de Vimianzo
- Iberism
