= Filomena Dato =

Galician feminist and writer

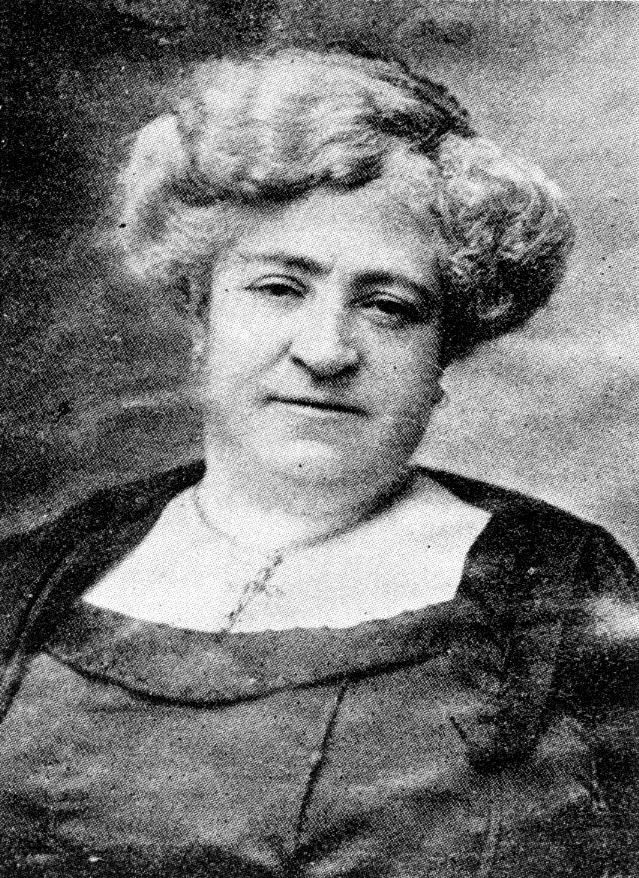
Filomena Dato Muruais

Filomena Dato Muruais (1856 – 1 May 1926) was a Galician feminist and writer in Castilian Spanish and the Galician language. Remaining in Galicia all her life, she joined movements associated with Galician culture and to liberate women from stigmatization. Of the three poetry books published by Spanish women in galician in the 19th century, one was by Dato.

== Biography ==
Filomena Dato was born in Ourense, 1856. Little or almost nothing is known about Dato's life in a personal sense, beyond the great friendship that she established with her contemporaries Sofía Casanova and Emilia Pardo Bazán. Filomena collaborated with poetic compositions in newspapers such as El Heraldo gallego, Galicia Recreativa or Album literario

Dato wrote for various magazines and journals, and was awarded prizes. As with Catalan contemporaries, her early writing was in Castilian before she switched to Galician. Her poetic compositions were published in newspapers such as El Heraldo Gallego, Galicia Recreativa and Album Literario. She participated in the Rexurdimento, the literary movement that revitalized the Galician language as a means of expression, following in the likes of Valentín Lamas Carvajal.

Dato was a fervent feminist, in alignment with Rosalía de Castro. In fact, these two poets are the best representatives of the feminist lyric of 19th century Spain, in a historical context in which machismo was the dominant ideology, not only among people without cultural training, but also among intellectuals. These still asked questions such as if women had a soul, if they had conscience and remorse, or if they were the bearers of sin by inheritance from Eve, among others, being very frequent in social and philosophical debates. It was a time of adversity for women like Dato herself, Rosalía de Castro or Cecilia Böhl de Faber (Fernán Caballero), which gives her literary production greater value. The feminist claim and defense of the aforementioned woman is very present in ''Follatos'' (1891), her only book in the Galician language; it was dedicated to Infanta Sabela Francisca de Borbón. The book is a compilation of forty-five poems as a complaint against gender stereotypes, in addition to including a series of writings on religiosity and intimacy, very much in the line of typical 19th century Romanticism.

Dato continued to dedicate her life to the world of literature, despite the blindness that she was acquiring, practically until her death at age 70, in A Coruña, 1 May 1926.

== Awards and honours ==
Dato received awards in numerous literary competitions. She won three awards in 1887 for her notable poem "Defensa das mulleres", in addition to being one of the five awarded poets at the Juegos Florales de Tui in 1891.

In 1906, she was appointed a corresponding member of the Real Academia Gallega, along with other contemporaries such as Carmen Beceiro, Emilia Calé and Sofía Casanova.

== Selected works ==
- Punumbras, 1880
- Follatos, 1891
- co-author, Las mujeres españolas, americanas y lusitanas pintadas por sí mismas
- essay on Benito Jerónimo Feijoo's "Defensa de las mujeres"
