= Galician Solidarity =

Galician Solidarity Solidaridad Gallega
- Founded: 1907
- Dissolved: 1912
- Merger of: Republican Union; Carlist Party; Agrarians; Galician League; Federal Democratic Republican Party
- Newspaper: Solidarismo Gallego (Until 1908); Galicia Solidaria (Note: Leftist faction.) and Solidaridad Gallega (Note: Official.)
- Ideology: Galicianism; Agrarianism; Autonomism; Opposition to turnismo Opposition to Client politics
- Political position: Big tent

Galician Solidarity (SG, Solidaridad Gallega in Spanish language) was a Galician regionalist political organization active between 1907 and 1912.

== History ==
After the electoral triumph of Catalan Solidarity in the elections of 1907, (Note: 40 MPs and the 6.9% of the vote.) contacts between the opposition forces increased in Galicia for the establishment of a political force that would bring together all the sectors opposed to the turnista system and to caciquismo. Autonomy for Galicia was the other main goal of Galician Solidarity.

In the summer of 1907, 44 people have signed the Manifesto Solidario, which gave rise to Galician Solidarity. Among the founders of Solidarity were the republicans led by José Rodríguez Martínez, federal republicans led by Segundo Moreno Barcia, traditionalists led by Juan Vázquez de Mella and the regionalists led by Manuel Murguía, Galo Salinas and Uxío Carré.

The opposition towards caciquismo and support for agricultural associations were the main pillars of the organization. Under the patronage of Galician Solidarity, 400 agrarian societies were formed, although in 1911 only 85 remained affiliated with SG.

In the municipal elections of 1909 SG obtained 258 town councilors in the province of A Coruña (absolute majority in 12 municipalities), but the differences between the members and currents of the organization prevented their consolidation. In the municipal elections of 1910 obtained bad results.

== Press ==
Solidarismo Gallego was the official newspaper of SG, published for the first time in December 1907. On April 16, 1908, Solidarismo Gallego was replaced by the weekly Solidaridad Gallega, also directed by Rodrigo Sanz and disappeared in 1911 or 1912. The republican and leftist faction edited Galicia Solidaria between 1907 and 1908.

== Factions ==
- Republicans: this faction was formed mainly by urban and left-wing people, specially by the members of the Republican Union. The republican faction was very strong in A Coruña and Ferrolterra.
- Federal Republicans: this faction was formed by left-wing federalists that were influenced by the ideas of Francesc Pi i Margall. The majority of federal republicans wanted to create a Galician State in a Federal Spanish Republic. The majority of them were organized in the Federal Democratic Republican Party. This faction was very strong in Lugo and Ferrolterra.
- Traditionalist: this faction was formed by carlists and conservative Catholics. Most of them were organized in the Carlist Party. This faction was strong in Santiago.
- Regionalists: this faction was formed by mainly liberal regionalists. Their main leaders were Manuel Murguía and Eugenio Carré Aldao. They're main goal was the autonomy of Galiza. This faction was strong in the city of A Coruña, were a lot of the members of the Galician League had joined SG.
- Agrarianists: this faction was composed of agrarianist activist of the rural areas. Some of them would later join Acción Gallega. This factions supported the creation of agrarian associations and agrarian unions. The agrarianist also wanted to end the foros, an amount of money that the galician peasants had to pay to the owners of their land (mainly low nobility, the church and rich farmers).
