= Galician League =

Galician League may refer to:

- Galician League (A Coruña)
- Galician League (Santiago de Compostela)
- Galician Student League
