= María Cardarelly =

Spanish photographer

- María Cecilia Cardarelly Bousquet
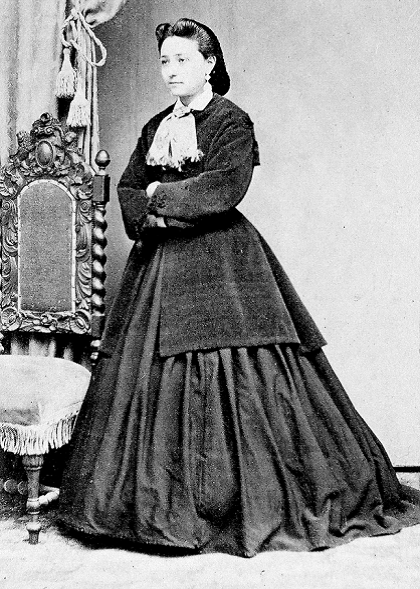
- Born: 1845; Zaragoza
- Died: 1920 (aged 74–75)
- Occupation: Photographer
- Notable work: Rosalia de Castro Portraits

María Cecilia Cardarelly Bousquet, better known as María Cardarelly (Zaragoza, 1845 - Madrid, c. 1920) was a Spanish photographer, known for being one of the first women to have her own photographic studio in Spain and the first in Galicia. She was the first known portraitist of the poet and writer Rosalía de Castro.

== Biography ==
After leaving Zaragoza, the French family of dyers Mariana Bousquet and Agustín Cardarelly arrived in Galicia around 1851, settling for a time in Lugo. It is known that the Cardarellys were itinerant dyers, so they also worked in Orense and Santiago de Compostela, where they finally settled around 1854, when Cardarelly was nine years old. After a short stay in Rúa Nova, they established their home and business in Rúa do Hórreo.

Cardarelly grew up in an atmosphere typical of the petit bourgeoisie of the foreign industrialists settled in the city, where it was common to meet and socialise with one another. It is very likely that the Cardarellys befriended the Osterbergers or the Segonds, as well as some of the liberal intellectuals of the time with whom they shared their concerns. These contacts would explain their relationship with the poet Rosalía de Castro and the writer Manuel Murguía, and with other contemporary photographers of a similar ideology.

=== Approach to photography ===
It is not clear what inspired her to take up photography, and there seems to have been no family tradition. It is thought that her work as a retoucher and background painter in one of the local photographic studios may have helped her to train in photography.

This theory is supported by the fact that the first photograph attributed to her, a portrait of Teresa Lamas, sister of the local judge, taken in Noya, bears only the signature of the background, reading M. Cardarelly. This portrait, taken in front of the photographic studio in Santiago de Compostela, could only be attributed to the person who painted the background. According to another theory, some of her paternal relatives were established photographers in Paris, which could have influenced her, and the portrait was taken outside the photographic studio located in Santiago de Compostela.

However, there is evidence of a relationship between Cardarelly and the photographer Eliseo Segond, who is also the author of the only known photograph of Cardarelly. In 1864, when Cardarelly was 19 years old, she began working as a studio photographer at her family's home, a business she maintained for three years, before giving up the profession and never working as a photographer again.

Cardarelly is known as Rosalía de Castro's first portraitist, for two photographs, one belonging to the collection of family portraits donated by Gala Martínez-Murguía de Castro to the Royal Galician Academy, and the other discovered by writer Anxo Angueira in 2013. Both were taken in the same session around 1865 and bear the stamp of her studio, but these were not the only images that Cardarelly took of the Murguía-de Castro family. In 2017, it was discovered that another of the donated photographs was signed by Cardarelly and corresponded to a portrait of the Castro's first daughter, Alejandra.The attribution of these four photographs to Cardarelly's authorship, and the fact that three of them are of the Murguía-de Castro family, suggests a probable relationship between the writing couple and the dyers' family.

What distinguished Cardarelly from the other women photographers of her time was that, unlike her, most of them worked in photography as partners or mere collaborators of their husbands or fathers.

Cardarelly was also far ahead of the Mindonian Antonia Santos, who in 1872 became the second female photographer to work in Galicia.

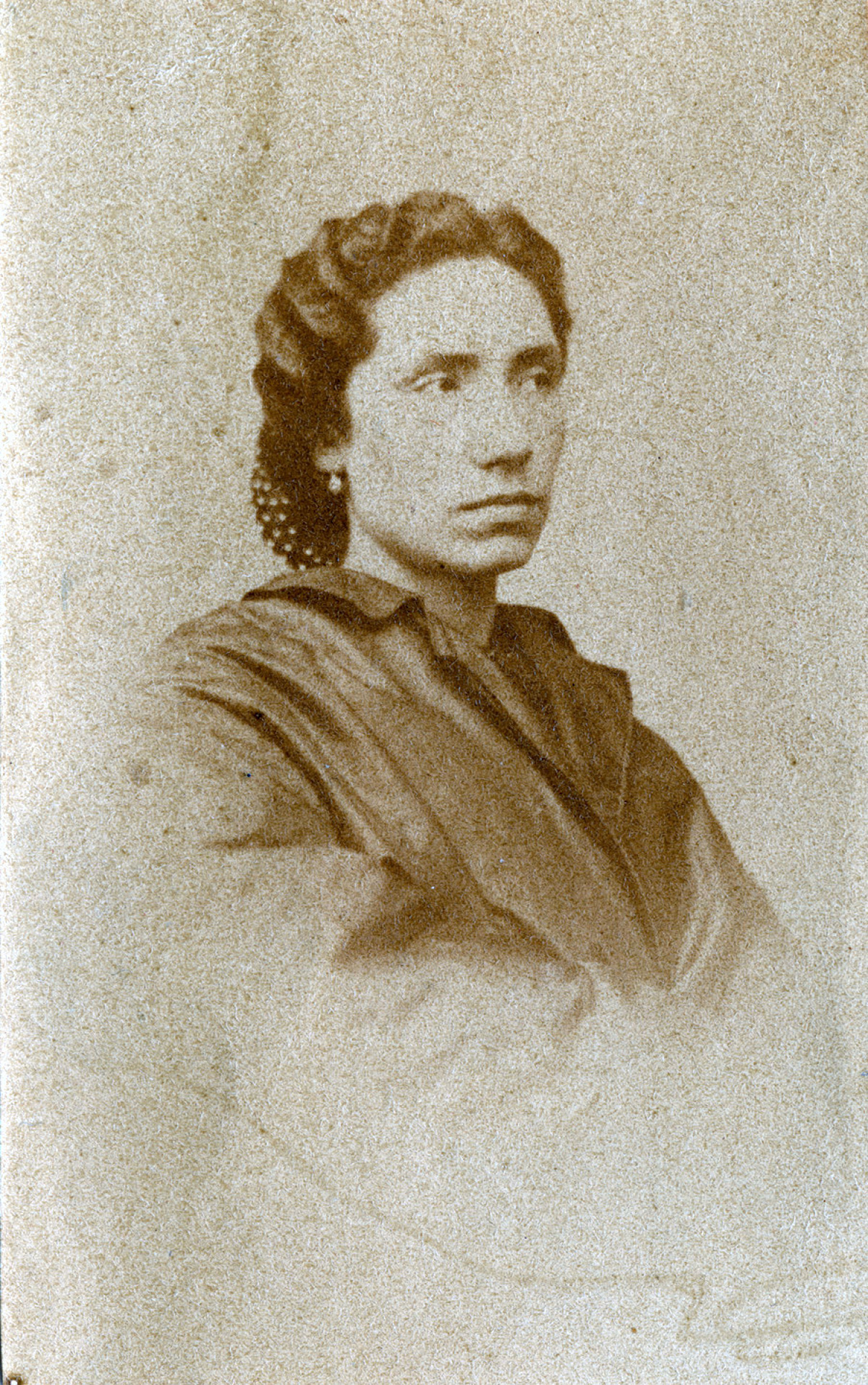
Rosalía Castro de Murguía by María Cardarelly

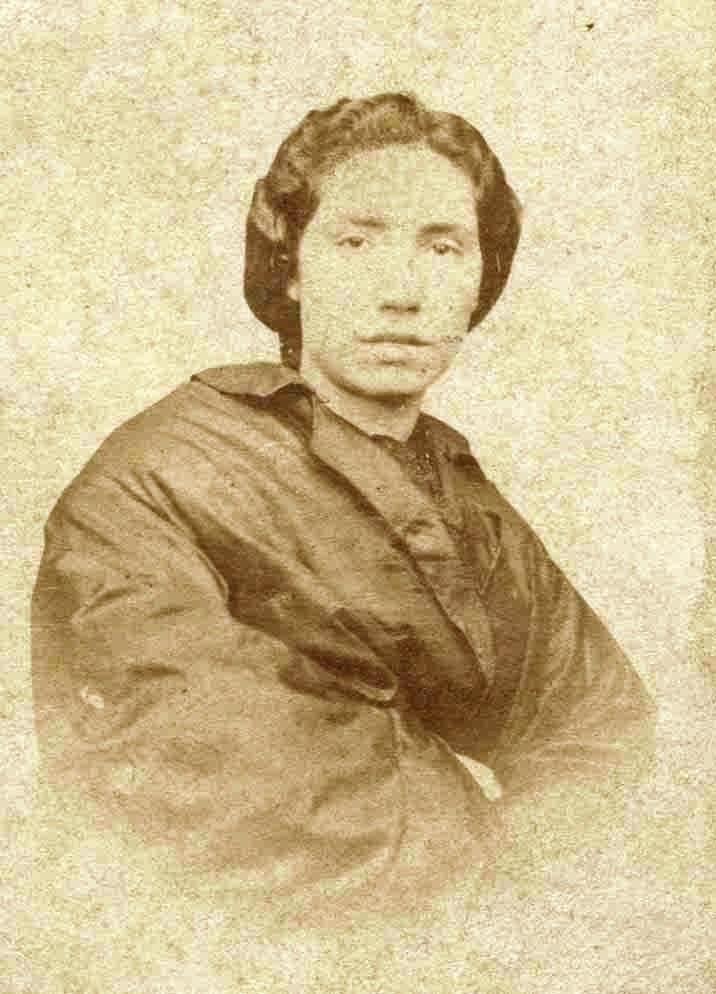
Rosalia de Castro

=== Pianist in Ferrol ===
In 1866, the Cardarelly family left Santiago and set up a new dye shop in Rúa María in Ferrol,where photography was finally put on hold. At the end of 1867, however, his father died of an illness, leaving his mother and Cardarelly unprotected. After two months, Cardarelly married the Madrid painter Juan Velasco, with whom she had a daughter, Matilde Dolores (born 1869). Cardarelly's father died in 1867, leaving Cardarelly and her mother unprotected.

Cardarelly started selling pianos with the pianist Canuto Berea Rodríguez out of a need for income and perhaps a desire for independence. She also gave private lessons to girls in the city for many years, and gave piano recitals at various social events in Ferrol. It was during this time that she became friends with the Spanish pianist and composer Eugenia Osterberger, also known as Madame Saunier.

She remarried in 1881 to military engineer Antonio Pérez, who died three years later in the Philippines, following the deaths of her daughter and then her husband in 1878.

After the turn of the century, Cardarelly's inner circle dwindled considerably and in 1910, aged 65, she moved to Madrid to live with relatives. It is estimated that she died around the second decade of the 20th century.
