= Pauman =

Pauman or Paumán is a surname. Notable people with the surname include:

- Dániel Pauman (born 1986), Hungarian canoeist
- Evaristo Martelo Paumán (1850–1928), Spanish aristocrat, writer and politician
