= Rexurdimento =

19th-century Galician revivalist movement

The Rexurdimento (Galician for 'resurgence') was a period in the History of Galicia during the 19th century. Its central feature was the revitalization of the Galician language as a vehicle of social and cultural expression after the so-called séculos escuros ("dark centuries") in which the dominance of Castilian Spanish was nearly complete. The Galician Rexurdimento coincides with the Catalan Renaixença.

Romanticism led to a revival of regionalism in the Iberian Peninsula. Languages besides the official Castilian Spanish were reevaluated. In contrast to the universalizing Age of Enlightenment, a positive value was placed on regional traditions, languages, and dialects. In Galicia, Castilian Spanish had become the language of the cities and of the bourgeoisie, while Galician had become a largely rural language without a live literary tradition. This created some degree of diglossia, with Castilian Spanish dominating literary and business use, and Galician being strictly a language of daily life.

== Road to the Rexurdimento ==
The transitional phase from the séculos escuros to the Rexurdimento is referred to by literary historians as the Prerrexurdimento. Within the Prerrexurdimento, two phases can be roughly distinguished, before and after the unsuccessful Solís Uprising of 1846. The first phase involved a rather diffuse revival of the Galician language; the second is more concentrated, including the first new Galician-language works in centuries to gain acclaim.

From 1840 onward, groups of intellectuals saw Galicia as a backward region whose advancement was dependent on the formation of a regional or national identity. This provincialist movement centered at the University of Santiago de Compostela; its most prominent figure was Antolín Faraldo Asorey.

The failed Solís Uprising of 1846, an uprising against centralism, ended with the summary execution of the so-called Martyrs of Carral. This political and military defeat nonetheless awoke Galician literary consciousness. Authors who shared the idea of Galicia as their fatherland published in magazines such as El Centinela de Galicia ("The Galician Sentinel") and La Aurora de Galicia. Benito Viceto published a History of Galicia (1865–1866) a heroic narrative of Galician history in six volumes. Important works from this period include the Proezas de Galicia ("Prowess of Galicia") by Fernández Neira, A gaita gallega ("The Galician Bagpipes") by Juan Manuel Pintos (1853), the founding of the Juegos Florales de Galicia ("Floral Games of Galicia") in A Coruña (1861), as well as publications such as El álbum de la caridad ("The Charity Album") and newspapers that published fragments of Galician-language novels and plays.

The two foremost Galician-language genres from this time were political writings and the revival of Galician as a literary language. The first of the political writings were linked to the Peninsular War, viewed throughout Spain as a war of independence against Napoleonic France: Un labrador que foi sarxento ("A farmer who was a sergeant", 1808) and several dialogues, the first of them being Proezas de Galicia explicadas baxo la conversación rústica de los dos compadres Chinto y Mingote ("Prowess of Galicia explained through the rustic conversation of two comrades Chinto and Mingote") by José Fernández de Neira (1812). Later, pamphlets and newspapers published polemics on both sides in the struggle between absolutism and liberalism, and other polemics critical of the administrative situation of the region. On the literary front were villancicos (intended to be sung), one play (A casamenteira by Antonio Benito Fandiño, published in 1849 and centered on arranged marriage), satirical sonnets, two books of poetry by Nicomedes Pastor Díaz, and various other works. Francisco Añón was another author relevant in this period.

Professor Dolores Vilavedra, while cautious in drawing conclusions, sees this phase of the Prerrexurdimento as basically a Galician form of artistic and political Romanticism. Some institutions developed during this period, such as an Academia Literaria de Santiago with its official organ El Idólatra de Galicia, and magazines such as Revista de Galicia. However, many of these institutions were repressed after the 1846 Solís Uprising.

The intellectual heirs of this thwarted movement were a group of young people, among them Manuel Murguía, Eduardo Pondal, and Rosalía de Castro. Their gathering in 1856 at the Banquete de Conxo ("Banquet of Conxo") marks the founding of the Liceo de la Juventud as a gathering place and a base for cultural activism.

== The Rexurdimento proper ==
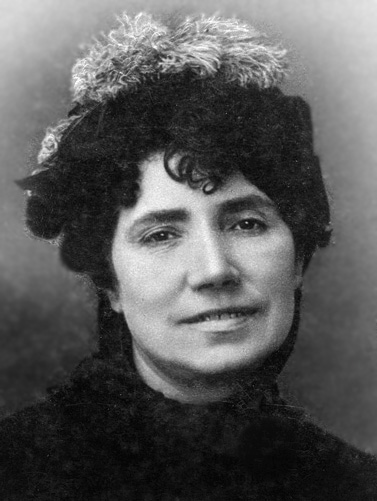
Rosalía de Castro, author of Cantares Gallegos (1863).

The Rexurdimento is conventionally considered to begin with the publication of Rosalía de Castro's book of poems Cantares Gallegos in 1863. Nonetheless, there is no sharp break from the Prerrexurdimento to the Rexurdimento, and there were no other significant publications in Galician for over a decade after the Cantares Gallegos, a period that includes Spain's Glorious Revolution and the subsequent liberal era.

However, beginning in 1875 more works were published in Galician, including, again, newspapers, the most famous of which was O Tío Marcos da Portela ("Uncle Marcos from Portela", 1876–1889). The Biblioteca Gallega ("Galician Library") published 52 works beginning in 1885, including such prominent works as Aires da miña terra ("Airs of My Land") by Manuel Curros Enríquez and Queixumes dos Pinos ("Moans of the Pines") by Eduardo Pondal.

1880 was a particularly outstanding year, with the publication of Follas Novas ("New Leaves") by Rosalía de Castro, Aires da miña terra by Curros Enríquez, and Espiñas, follas e frores. Ramiño primeiro ("Spines, Leaves, and Fronds. First Sprigs") by Valentín Lamas Carvajal.

In 1886, for the first time, a literary contest was held, confined to Galician-language works. Poetry was particularly prominent, and anthologies of Galician poetry began to appear. In a more political vein, that year saw the publication of Los precursores ("The Precursors") by Manuel Murguía.

These years also saw the publication of many grammar books, dictionaries, and critical literary studies, and further history books, including another History of Galicia by Manuel Murguía. Furthermore, there was a recovery of the splendid works in Galician by medieval troubadours, the Cantigas. The first such work to be published was the Cancionero de la Vaticana (1875), followed by Colocci Brancuti (1889), Cantigas de Alfonso X El Sabio (1889), and Cancionero de Ajuda (1904).

The first significant published prose fiction in Galician was by Marcial Valladares Núñez. His Maxina ou a filla espúrea ("Maxina or A Spurious Daughter") appeared in the 1880s in a series of inserts in a magazine; the manuscript dates from 1870). The book is particularly unusual in its mix of Galician and Castilian Spanish to suggest the bifurcated lives of its characters. The first drama in Galician was Rentar de Castromil (1904) by Evaristo Martelo Paumán.

The canon Antonio López Ferreiro is considered the true father of the Galician novel. He wrote three novels, the best known of which is A tecedeira de Bonabal ("The Weaver of Bonabal"), published in installments in Galician newspapers. These realistic works with aspects of the historical novel are set at different points in Galician history.

Costumbrismo, the literary or pictorial interpretation of local everyday life, mannerisms, and customs, was also active in Galicia, as it was elsewhere in Spain. However, in Galicia it focused almost entirely on rural life. Urban narratives in Galician began to appear only toward the end of the 19th century, as in the work of Francisco Álvarez de Novoa, urban, bourgeois, and psychological. This was a prelude to the innovative writers of the Irmandades da Fala.

There were very few theatrical works associated with the Rexurdimento.
