= Basilio Álvarez =

Spanish journalist, politician and catholic priest

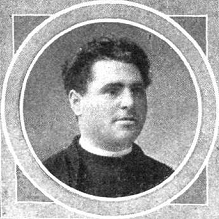
Basilio Álvarez in Mundo Gráfico

Basilio Álvarez (1877–1943) was a Spanish priest, journalist and politician related to the Galician agrarianist movement. He was deputy by Ourense during the Second Spanish Republic, as a member of the Radical Republican Party.

== Biography ==
Born in Ourense in 1877, was ordained priest in 1902. In 1907 he settled in Madrid, although by 1912 would return to Beiro, Galicia. His career as a religious was characterized by an unorthodox interpretation of the rules of the Catholic Church, where there is no choice of celibacy —but in fact came to have two children. These circumstances, among others, were the reason that between 1914 and 1928 was suspended by the Church. He has been described as a "picturesque" personality.

On his journalistic work he collaborated in publications such as La Nueva Época, El Eco, Galicia, Acción Gallega, El Parlamentario or La Zarpa. He was also director of the Catholic newspaper El Debate and author of works such as El cural rural (1904), Por los agros celtas (1907), El libro del periodista (1912), Abriendo el surco (1913), among others. His works and his meetings were in Spanish language.

He was one of the founders of the movement Acción Gallega, linked to the Galician agrarianist movement. He was known for his criticism of the caciquismo as an agricultural agreement that dominated medieval Galicia known as "foro". After 1913 he began to closer his speech to the workers movement and around 1915 Basilio Álvarez proposed collaboration with socialists and republicans. Opposite to centralism, advocated a federal structure in Spain. Some have drawn parallelism s between the rhetorical style and language of Álvarez —which has come to be described as "incendiary", "cult", passionate or "Baroque"— with those of Alejandro Lerroux. Basilio Álvarez was a "charismatic orator".

In the early 1930s he joined the Radical Republican Party, with which it secured the 1931 deputy act for the circumscription of Ourense. He however left the group in 1935, for to be a member of a party the ephemeral Manuel Portela Valladares' Party of Democratic Center in 1936. Following the outbreak of the Spanish Civil War he went into exile. He died in 1943 in Tampa, Florida.

== Notes ==
=== Bibliography ===
- Cabo Villaverde, Miguel (2013). "Acción Gallega: Populismo agrario y cambio político en la Galicia de la Restauración, 1912-1915". Segle xx. Revista catalana d'història (in Spanish) (6). Catarroja: Afers: 113–131. ISSN 2339-6806.
- Durán, José Antonio (30 June 1973). "Basilio Álvarez: radiografía de un agitador". Triunfo (in Spanish) (561): 21–23. ISSN 0211-2868. OCLC 704012177.
- Tezanos Gandarillas, Marisa (1997). "Basilio Álvarez: "una sotana casi rebelde"" (PDF). Espacio, tiempo y forma. Serie V, Historia contemporánea (in Spanish) (10). Madrid: Universidad Nacional de Educación a Distancia: 151–178. ISSN 1130-0124. OCLC 722124019.
- Vicente Algueró, Felipe-José de (2012). El catolicismo liberal en España (in Spanish). Madrid: Encuentro. ISBN 978-8-499-20124-5. OCLC 779876611.
