= Os Pinos =

Anthem of Galicia, Spain

English: The Pines
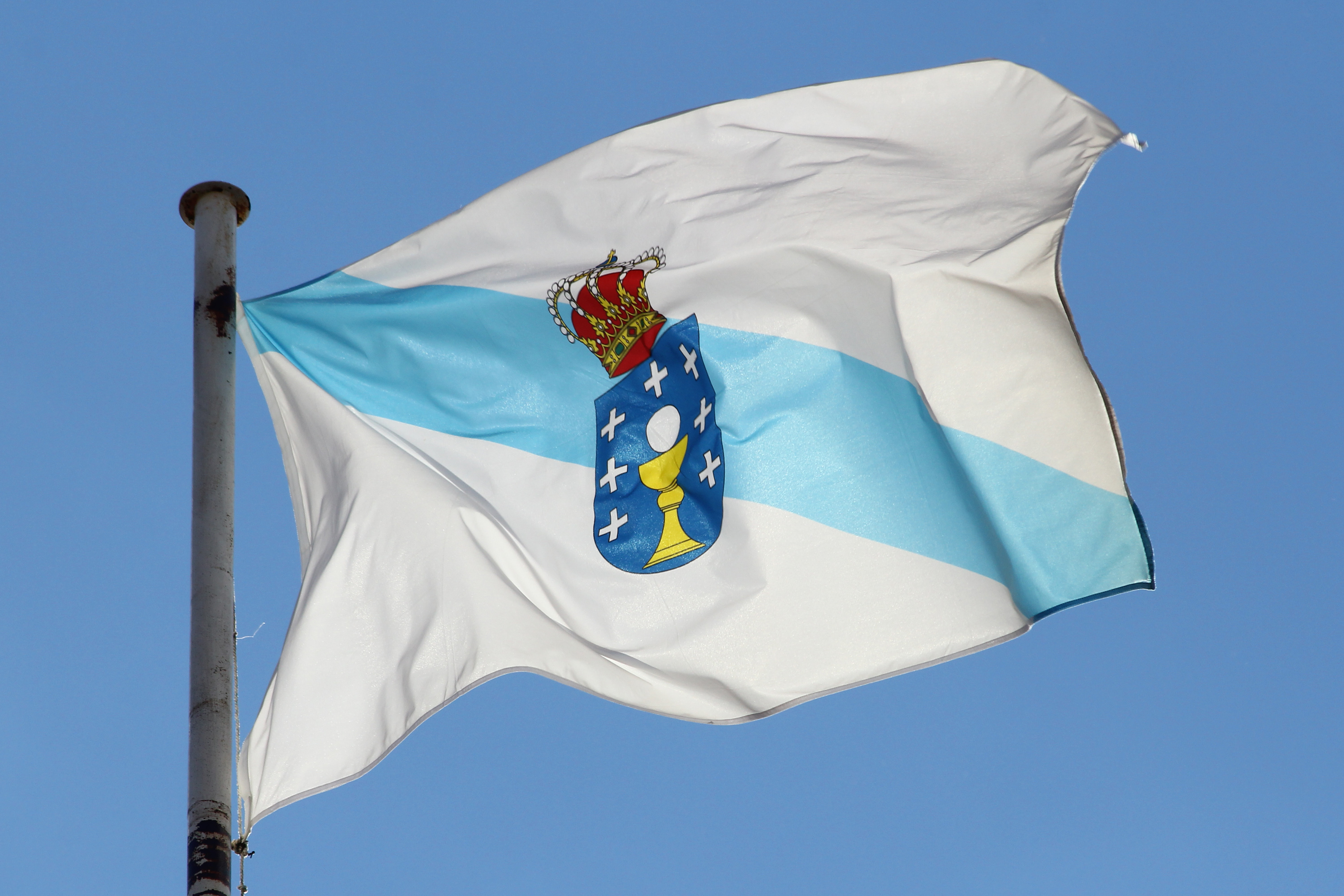
- National anthem of Galicia, Spain
- Lyrics: Eduardo Pondal, 1907
- Music: Pascual Veiga, 1907
- Adopted: 1977

"Os Pinos" (The Pines; pronounced [ʊs ˈpinʊs]) is the official anthem of Galicia, in Spain. The lyrics were written by Eduardo Pondal (the two first parts of his poem Queixumes dos pinos, "Lamentations of the Pines") and the music by Pascual Veiga. It was composed in Havana, Cuba, where it was performed for the first time in 1907. It was officially adopted by the Galician authorities in 1977.

== Lyrics ==
Galician original

Que din os rumorosos
na costa verdecente,
ao raio transparente
do prácido luar?
Que din as altas copas
de escuro arume arpado
co seu ben compasado
monótono fungar?

Do teu verdor cinguido
e de benignos astros,
confín dos verdes castros
e valeroso chan,
non des a esquecemento
da inxuria o rudo encono;
desperta do teu sono
fogar de Breogán.

Os bos e xenerosos
a nosa voz entenden,
e con arroubo atenden
o noso rouco son,
mais só os iñorantes,
e féridos e duros,
imbéciles e escuros
non nos entenden, non.

Os tempos son chegados
dos bardos das idades
que as vosas vaguedades
cumprido fin terán;
pois onde quer, xigante
a nosa voz pregoa
a redenzón da boa
nazón de Breogán.

Portuguese

Que dizem os rumorosos
na costa verdecente,
ao raio transparente
do plácido luar?
Que dizem as altas copas
de escuro arume serrado
com o seu bem compassado
monótono fungar?

Do teu verdor cingido
e de benignos astros,
confim dos verdes castros
e valoroso solo,
não dês a esquecimento
da injúria o rude rancor;
desperta do teu sono
lar de Breogán.

Os bons e generosos
a nossa voz entendem,
e com arroubo atendem
o nosso rouco som,
mas só os ignorantes,
e ásperos e duros,
imbecis e escuros
não nos entendem, não.

Os tempos são chegados
dos bardos das idades
que as vossas vaguidades
cumprido fim terão;
pois onde quer, gigante
a nossa voz pregoa
a redenção da boa
nação de Breogán.

Spanish

¿Qué dicen los rumorosos,
en la costa enverdecida
al transparente rayo
de la plácida luz de luna?
¿Qué dicen las altas copas
de oscuro follaje arpado
con su bien acompasado
monótono zumbar?

De tu verdor ceñido
y de benignos astros,
confín de los verdes castros
y del valeroso suelo,
no des al olvido
de la injuria el rudo enconamiento;
despierta de tu sueño
Hogar de Breogán.

Los buenos y generosos,
nuestra voz entienden
y con devoción atienden
nuestro ronco sonido,
pero solo los ignorantes
y los salvajes y los duros,
imbéciles y oscuros,
no nos entienden, no.

Ya llegaron los tiempos
de los bardos de las edades
en que vuestras vaguedades
cumplido fin tendrán;
pues, por doquier, gigante
nuestra voz pregona
la redención de la buena
Nación de Breogán.

English translation

What do the murmurers say
on the verdant coast
under the transparent beam
of the calm moonlight?
What do the high treetops
of dark bent foliage say
in their harmonious
monotonous hum?

Girded by your greenness,
and by benign stars,
boundary of the green hill forts
and worthy land,
do not let into oblivion
the harsh rancour of insult;
awaken from your slumber,
homeland of Breoghan.

The good and generous
understand our voices,
and eagerly they listen
to our rough sounds;
but only the ignorant,
and barbaric and cruel,
imbecilic and dark
don't understand us.

The times are now upon us
of the bards of the ages,
when all your wanderings
shall achieve their end;
for everywhere, gigantic,
our voice proclaims
the redemption of the good
nation of Breoghan.

== In popular culture ==
During the 1982 FIFA World Cup group stage match between Poland and Italy in Vigo, "Os Pinos" was played mistakenly instead of Mazurek Dąbrowskiego; however, Mazurek Dąbrowskiego was played after the Italian anthem beside the Spanish one.

== See also ==
- Anthems of the autonomous communities of Spain
