= Acción Gallega =

Acción Gallega Galician Action
- Leader: Basilio Álvarez
- Founded: January 15, 1910
- Dissolved: 1914
- Newspaper: Acción Gallega
- Ideology: Agrarianism; Galicianism; Populism; Cooperativism; Autonomism; Opposition to Foros; Opposition to turnismo Opposition to Caciquismo
- Congreso de los Diputados (1910): 1 / 404

Acción Gallega (AG, Galician Action in English language) was one of the most important agrarianist, antiturnista and anti-client politics (anticaciquismo) political movements in Galicia in the 20th century. With a decidedly antiforal (Note: The Foros were abusive contracts between the peasants and the landowners in Galicia until their total abolition in 1926. Foros were long-term or often perpetual, so that a person or institution ceded the use or/and benefit of a thing (almost always a land), in exchange for the fulfillment of various conditions previously laid down. This conditions were normally a part of the agrarian production or a part of the monetarian of the production. Sometimes the peasants had to pay up to the 50% of its production. It was a mode of semifeudal exploitation of the land, with the owners usually being fidalgos (low nobility), priests or rich peasants.) and redemptionist (Note: Redención meant the total abolition of the foros and the delivery of the land ownership to the peasants.) character, in its first formulation, constituted the radical sector of the Galician agrarianist in the 1910s.

== History ==
=== Origins ===
The origins of AG lie in the agitated year of 1909. In that year, a group of Galician politicians, intellectuals and journalists living in Madrid met day after day. They were: Basilio Álvarez, Alfredo Vicenti, Manuel Portela Valladares, Enrique Peinador, Luís Antón del Olmet, Prudencio Canitrot, Alfonso Alcalá Martín, Ricardo Vilariño, Rafael Carvajal, Cánovas Cervantes, Eloy Páramo, etc. The topic of their discussions was the constant agrarian and antiforal struggles in Galicia; namely the liberation of the Galician peasants and, more generally, of Galicia in general. Acción Gallega was conceived as a movement in that tumultuous context. On January 15, 1910, the movement gave the first public sign of life, with the appearance of Acción Gallega, the official magazine of the movement, subtitled Biweekly Magazine and defender of regional interests. Basilio Álvarez was the main promoter of the magazine and of the movement. A part of this journalistic campaign, AG also initiated a series of meetings and actions of different nature. Agrarianist associations of Ribadeo, Riotorto, Fonsagrada, Becerreá and other municipalities joined AG.

=== Elections and the united agrarian party ===
The rallies and meetings of Acción Gallega began in the Terras de Meira with Basilio Álvarez, Prudencio Canitrot, Cánovas Cervantes and Rafael Carvajal as the main speakers. The elections to the Spanish Cortes of 1910 allowed them to participate actively in the campaign, presenting three candidates: Rafael Carvajal, in the district of Mondoñedo; Alfredo Vicenti, by Becerreá, and Manuel Portela Valladares in Fonsagrada. The success was total in Fonsagrada, being Manuel Portela Valladares elected deputy, and an electoral fraud of the caciques prevented the triumph of Alfredo Vicenti in Becerreá. Acción Gallega gained a deputy in the Congreso de los Diputados.

At this early stage what AG wanted was to give a sense of unity to the Galician agrarian movement, split into different fronts (Galician Solidarity, antiforistas, Unión Campesina, etc.). This led to the attempt of creating in 1910, an unified agrarian political party in Galicia, the Liga Agrario-Redencionista (LAR), which was a total failure. After the failure of the LAR, the magazine Acción Gallega disappeared.

=== Radicalization ===
In 1911 a series of events radicalized the movement, along with their leader, Basilio Álvarez, which was increasingly interested in christian socialism. In August 1912 the "Manifesto de Ourense" appears, where Acción Gallega undertook a campaign of rallies, with an agrarian and cooperativist character, to collect the aspirations of the peasantry and send them to the Spanish Government. The rallies, that had a verbal radicalism unprecedented in Galicia, (Note: Basilio Álvarez even said that "Dynamite sometimes smells better than incense.") began in O Carballiño, and continued in Ribadavia, Gondomar, Ourense, Bande, A Estrada, etc. The tone of the speakers was radical, rebel and even openly revolutionary, especially the tone of Basilio Álvarez, which said that Madrid feared the possibility of a revolution in Galicia. The tone of the speakers was also increasingly regionalist and autonomist. Famous poets like Ramón Cabanillas and Antonio Noriega Varela made popular poems (all in Galician language) dedicated to the imminent revolution of the peasants. The official magazine, Acción Gallega, was printed again in 1912.

This radicalization made Acción Gallega lost some moderate supporters and gained more radical others, like the anarchists. Most of the press also began attacking the movement, which until then had defended.

=== End ===
Since 1912 the movement focused on fighting caciques, with a clear ideology inspired by the regenerationism and redemptionist antiforismo, again based in the oratorial skills of Basilio Alvarez and his group of unconditional friends.

The decomposition of AG was the result of the persecutions the movement suffered in its late years. Since 1913, the constitutional guarantees didn't apply to Acción Gallega, which was de facto banned. In 1914 the movement was involved in cases of unrest and terrorism. Due to his confrontation with the authorities and the bishop of Ourense Basilio Álvarez was forbidden to exercise the priesthood and, finally, his character of priest was withdrawn by the bishop Eustaquio Ilundáin y Esteban. Due to this Manuel Portela Valladares and Alfredo Vicenti abandoned Acción Gallega. This, and the split of the Ourense section of AG marked the end of the organization, in late 1914.

Despite the dissolution of Acción Gallega the Galician agrarian movement continued to be very influenced by its ideas and radicalism.

== Anthem ==
Acción Gallega used a poem of Ramón Cabanillas, written in 1910, as its official anthem.

Hino de Acción Gallega

¡Irmáns! ¡Irmáns galegos!
¡Desde Ortegal ó Miño
a folla do fouciño
fagamos rebrilar!

Que vexa a Vila podre,
coveira da canalla,
a Aldea que traballa
disposta pra loitar.

Antes de ser escravos,
¡irmáns, irmáns galegos!
que corra a sangre a regos
dende a montaña ó mar.

¡Ergámonos sen medo!
¡Que o lume da toxeira
envolva na fogueira
o pazo señorial!

Xa o fato de caciques
ladróns e herexes fuxe
ó redentor empuxe
da alma rexional

Antes de ser escravos,
¡irmáns, irmáns galegos!
que corra a sangre a regos
dende a montaña ó mar.

Hino de Acción Gallega (English translation)

Brothers, Galician brothers!
From Ortegal to the Miño
the blade of the sickle
make shine

Let the rotten town see
refuge of the scoundrels
the village that works
is ready for the fight

Betther than being slaves,
Brothers, Galician brothers!
let blood run in streams
from the mountain to the sea.

Wake up without fear!
that the fire of the toxeira
burn in flames
the palace of the landowners!

Already the gang of caciques,
thieves and heretics escapes
of the redeeming push
of the regional soul.

Betther than being slaves,
Brothers, Galician brothers!
let blood run in streams
from the mountain to the sea.
