= Galician League (Santiago de Compostela) =

Galician League Liga Gallega
- Leader: Alfredo Brañas
- Founded: 1898
- Dissolved: 1900
- Ideology: Galicianism; Conservatism; Political Catholicism; Traditionalism
- Religion: Catholicism

The Galician League of Santiago de Compostela (Liga Gallega in both Spanish and Galician language) was a conservative and Galician regionalist political group founded in 1898 in Santiago de Compostela. The main figures of the League were Alfredo Brañas and Salvador Cabeza de León.

It was one of the currents in which the Galician Regionalist Association bifurcated. The Galician League of Santiago de Compostela was conservative, while the Galician League of A Coruña was ideologically liberal.
