= Manuel Curros Enríquez =

Spanish author (1851–1908)

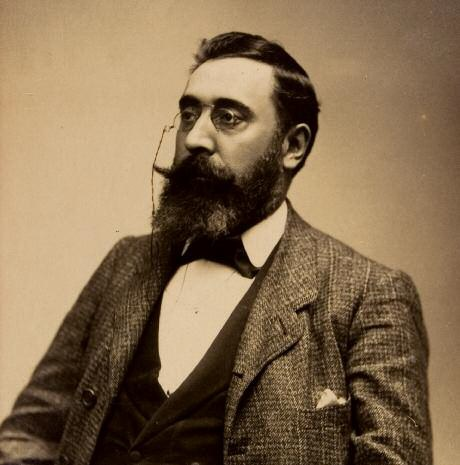
Manuel Curros Enriquez

Manuel Curros Enríquez (15 September 1851 – 7 March 1908) was a Galician writer, poet and journalist. He wrote in the Galician language, and is considered to be one of the leading figures of Galician culture and identity.

== Early life ==
Manuel Curros Enríquez was born in Celanova, Galicia, Spain. He was the son of a scriban. Manuel went to school until he had to help his father as a scriban.

When he was sixteen years old, he ran away from home and went to live with some relatives. He ended up in Madrid, living with his brother Ricardo. There, he had a chance to continue his studies and he even went to University. He started to study law, but did not get a degree.

He was still a Law student in Madrid when he started to publish poems in Galician. His "Cantiga", written around this time, was later put to music and has now become a popular Galician song.

After the revolution in September 1868, Curros adopted democratic ideals. He then began a literary career. He also shared a home with Modesta Luisa Polonia Vázquez Rodríguez beginning in 1871, having a son with her in 1873, and then marrying her in 1877.

In the same year, Curros won a prize in Ourense with his poem A Virxe do Cristal, and is widely recognized as a prominent Galician poet. He then moved to Ourense where he continued his writings.

In 1877 he moved back to Galicia and he took part in a Literary Competition in Ourense, being awarded several prizes for his submissions of Galician poetry. In 1880 he published Aires da miña terra, a book of poems that became greatly successful despite the bishop of Orense, Cesáreo Rodríguez, pressing charges against the author, saying that the book included heresies and blasphemies. The judges ordered the destruction of the issues that had not been sold yet, plus the originals, and Curros was found guilty of attacking the free exercise of cults in Ourense, though he was absolved in A Coruña. The trial became widely followed and increased the circulation and sales of his book, which sold out in fifteen days, a feat for a book written in a language at the time considered a mere unlearned dialect. This book appeared in the same year as Rosalia de Castro's Follas Novas, thus marking a momentum in the reawakening of Galician literature after centuries of silence. Having lost his job, he returned to Madrid in 1883 and began working in the Republican journal El Porvenir (The Future).

In the year 1888 he published O Divino Sainete, a combined satire on Dante's Divine Comedy and the religious establishment of the time in Spain. He also wrote journalism in Spanish extensively, in such remarkable cultural journals of the time as El Imparcial and in other Republican publications.

In 1894, he emigrated to Havana, where he was warmly received. He had a chance to publish his own newspaper, La Tierra Gallega (The Galician Land). However, this paper was not long-lived, and it was eventually suspended. Curros then joined the staff of another paper, El Diario de las Familias (Journal of the Families). In this new role, he supported the autonomists. This did not earn him the sympathies of the local authorities, nor of other Galicians.

He returned to A Coruña in 1904. He was cheered by regionalists. However, he would go back to Havana to work on another journal, Diario de la Marina.

In 1908 he was admitted at the Asturian Medical Center at Havana, because he refused to go to the Galician Medical Center. He was very ill. He died on February 7, 1908, and his remains were shipped back to Galicia.

== Works ==
- Cartas del Norte (1875-1876)
- A Virxe do Cristal (1877)
- Aires da miña terra (1880)
- O divino sainete (1888)

== See also ==
- Plaza de Curros Enríquez
