= Galician League (A Coruña) =

Galician League Liga Gallega
- Leader: Manuel Murguía
- Founded: 1897
- Dissolved: 1907
- Newspaper: Revista Gallega
- Ideology: Galicianism; Liberalism; Völkisch nationalism Autonomism

The Galician League of A Coruña (Liga Gallega in both Spanish and Galician language) was a liberal and Galician regionalist political group founded in 1897 in A Coruña by the participants in the regionalist club A Cova Céltiga (The Celtic Cave), with its headquarters in the Carré Aldao library; chaired by Manuel Murguía and directed by a committee consisting of Manuel Lugrís Freire, Uxío Carré Aldao and Salvador Golpe.

== History ==
In 1898 the statutes of the League were drafted, entirely in Galician language. Waldo Álvarez Insua was elected as the president of the organization in 1899. It was one of the currents in which the Galician Regionalist Association bifurcated. The Galician League of A Coruña was liberal, while the Galician League of Santiago de Compostela was ideologically conservative. The league demanded autonomy for Galiza, conducting in 1897 a signature collection to ask for the same autonomy than Cuba and Puerto Rico.

After 1900 the League had little activity, but survived until 1907. The official newspaper of the organization was the bilingual weekly Revista Gallega, directed by Galo Salinas. Thanks to an initiative of the League, and specially of Galo Salinas, in 1904 a monument to the Martyrs of Carral was built in the town of Carral.
