= Rosalía de Castro =

Spanish Galician poet, writer (1837–1885)

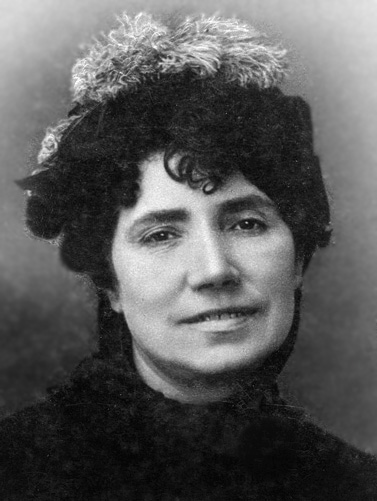
- Born: María Rosalía Rita de Castro; 23 February 1837; Santiago de Compostela, Galicia, Spain
- Died: 15 July 1885 (aged 48); Padrón, Galicia, Spain
- Citizenship: Spanish
- Occupation: Poet
- Spouse: Manuel Murguía
- Writing career
- Language: Galician; Spanish
- Period: Romanticism
- Movement: Rexurdimento

María Rosalía Rita de Castro (Galician pronunciation: [rosaˈli.ɐ ðɪ ˈkastɾʊ]; 23 February 1837 – 15 July 1885) was a Galician poet and novelist, considered one of the most important figures of the 19th-century Spanish literature and modern lyricism. Widely regarded as one of the greatest Galician cultural icons, she was a leading figure in the emergence of the literary Galician language. Through her work, she projected multiple emotions, including the yearning for the celebration of Galician identity and culture, and female empowerment. She is credited with challenging the traditional female writer archetype.

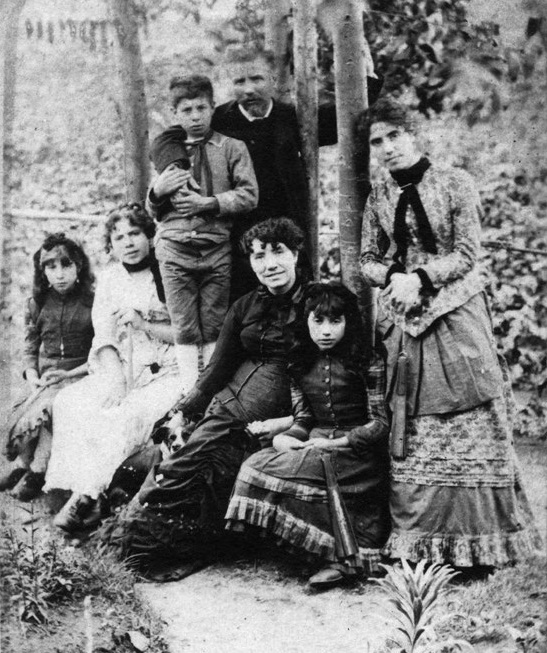
Rosalía with her family - 1884 (J. Palmeiro).

== Life ==
Writing in Galician and Spanish, after the period known as the Séculos Escuros (lit. Dark Centuries), she became an important figure of the Galician Romantic movement, known today as the Rexurdimento ("Renaissance"), along with Manuel Curros Enríquez and Eduardo Pondal. Her poetry is marked by saudade, an almost ineffable combination of nostalgia, longing and melancholy.

She married Manuel Murguía, a member of the important literary group known as the Royal Galician Academy, historian, journalist and editor of Rosalía's books. The couple had seven children: Alexandra (1859–1937), Aura (1868–1942), twins Gala (1871–1964) and Ovidio (1871–1900), Amara (1873–1921), Adriano (1875–1876) and Valentina (stillborn, 1877). Only two of Rosalía's children married, Aura in 1897 and Gala in 1922; neither they nor their siblings left any children, and thus, today there are no living descendants of Rosalía de Castro and her husband. Their son Ovidio was a promising painter, his career cut short by early death.

Rosalía published her first collection of poetry in Galician, Cantares gallegos ("Galician Songs"), on 17 May 1863. This date, 17 May, is now known as the Día das Letras Galegas ("Galician Literature Day"), and commemorates Rosalía's achievement by dedicating, every year, this special day to a different writer, who must also write in the Galician language, since 1963. Día das Letras Galegas is an official holiday in the Autonomous Community of Galicia.

Relative poverty and sadness marked Rosalía's life, in spite of this, she had a strong sense of commitment to the poor and to the defenseless. She was a strong opponent of abuse of authority and an ardent defender of women's rights. Rosalía suffered from uterine cancer and died in Padrón, province of A Coruña, Spain, on 15 July 1885.

She is buried in the Panteón de Galegos Ilustres, a pantheon (mausoleum) in the Convent of San Domingos de Bonaval in Santiago de Compostela, Spain.

== Legacy ==
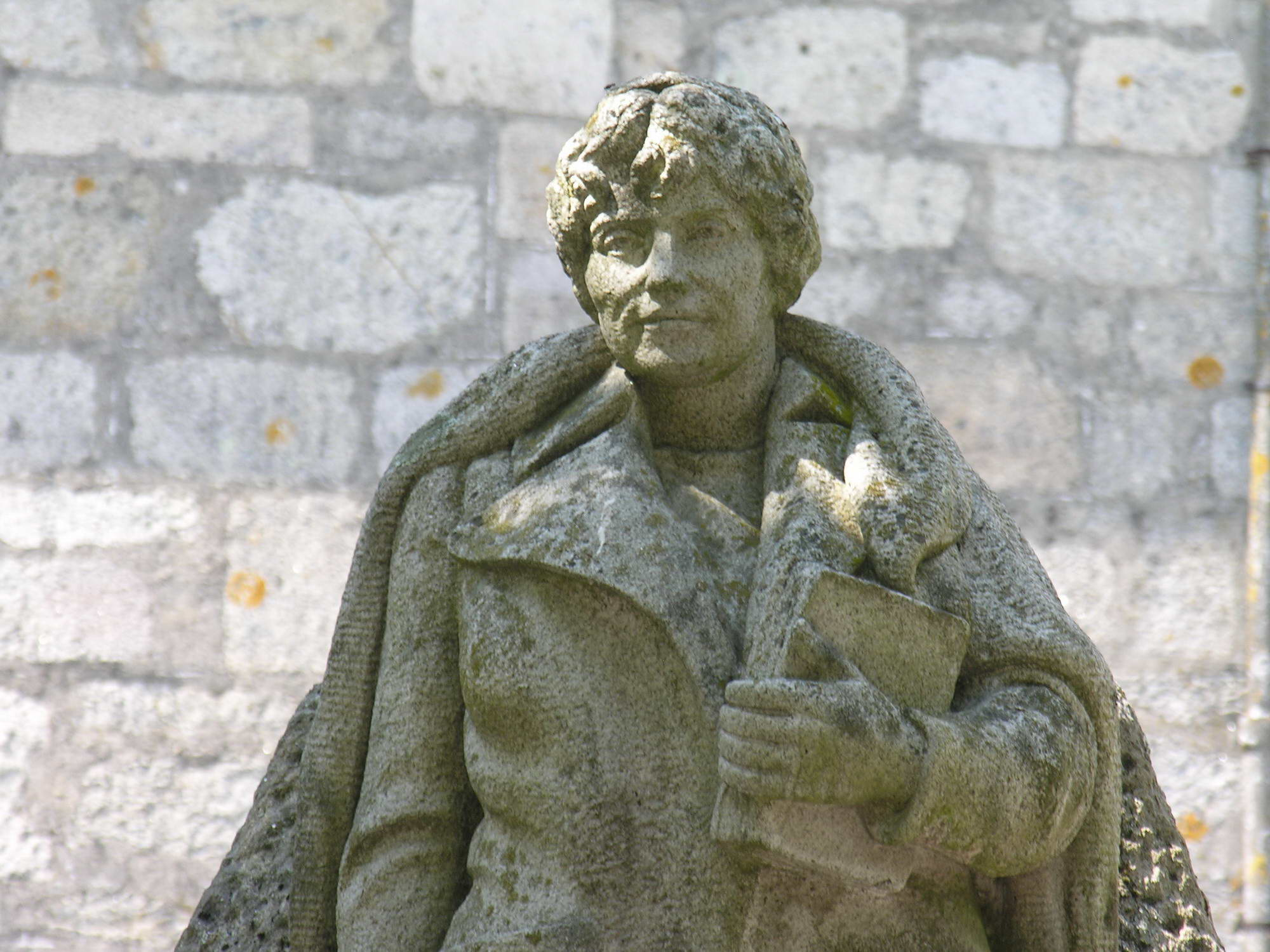
Statue of Rosalía de Castro at Padrón.

Rosalía de Castro was a poet laureate of Galicia. Expected to speak and write in Spanish and Galician, she chose to write her early poems in the Galician language. This earned her the contempt and spite of many that deemed Galician as a Spanish dialect fit "only for the illiterate and the churlish". However, Rosalía's gesture won her the admiration of those who spoke Galician at home or on a daily basis.

Schools in Galicia, in Spain, in Russia and in Uruguay, libraries, cultural associations, awards, parks, folklore groups, choirs, compositions of her poems, a Galician traditional morning song adorned with the lyrics of one of her poems, a professional sports team, monuments at home and abroad, a theater, restaurants, a label of white wine, lodgings, a banknote formerly in circulation, a postage stamp, a FS98 Iberia Airbus A340, a sea-rescue plane, a school train and many streets have all taken her name.

== International translations ==
Small Stations Press published Rosalía de Castro's Galician Songs in English, translated by *Erín Moure, in 2013. The Moure translation of de Castro's New Leaves was published by Small Stations in September 2016. In 2010 Edwin Mellen Press also published "the most thorough and representative volume of poetry and prose from Rosalía de Castro (1837–1885) ever translated into English." In 2007, Shearsman Books published a paperback of selected poems translated by Michael Smith. In 2004, Louis J. Rodrigues wrote for the literary magazine Babel a translation and analysis of two Rosalían poems, Nasín cando as prantas nasen and Negra Sombra. In 1991, State University of New York Press launched an English anthology edited and translated by Anna-Marie Aldaz, Barbara N. Gantt and Anne C. Bromley. In 1977 Kathleen Kulp-Hill translated several Galician poems as part of her work entitled "Rosalía de Castro"; this book is still available from AllBookstores.com. In 1964 the Spanish Ministry of Foreign Affairs published a selection of Galician poems translated into English by Charles David Ley; this book may be found in Spanish Rare Books libraries.

In Japan, the first volume of Rosalían poetry was translated in 2009 by Takekazu Asaka which is available from DTP Publishing (Tokyo). In the nineteen-nineties Katsuyo Ohata wrote two articles in the journal, "The Review of Inquiry and Research" at Kansai Gaidai University (Osaka, Japan) on the Galician poet: "El inconsciente creativo de Rosalía de Castro" and "En las orillas del Sar: El mundo íntimo de Rosalía de Castro."

Editoria Crisálida, in 2008, published an anthology of Rosalía's Galician poems in Portuguese, translated by Andityas Soares de Moura. There is a statue in her honor in the Galicia Square in the city of Porto, Portugal, by the sculptor Barata Feyo (September 1954).

In the French-speaking world Folle Avoine in 2003 offered a French anthology of Galician poems translated by Jose-Carlos Gonzalez.

== Recognition ==
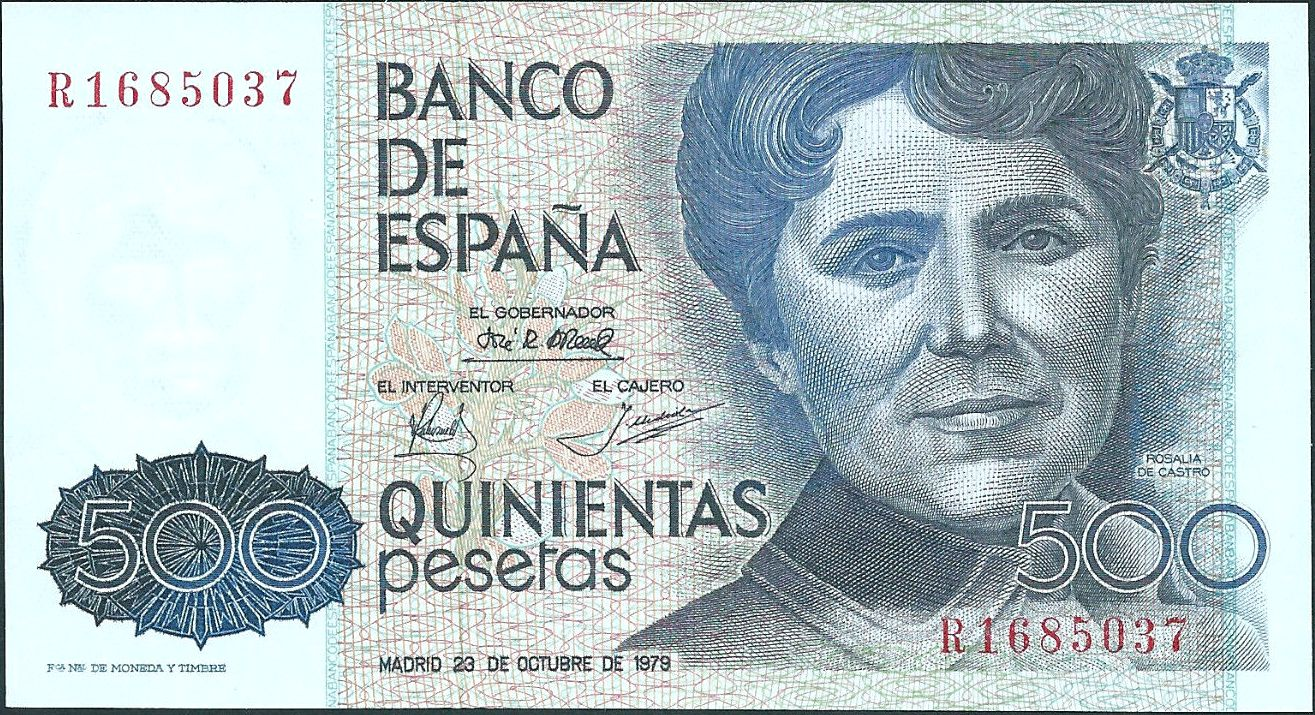
Rosalía de Castro on the 1979 500 Pesetas banknote.

The name Rosalía de Castro has been used by several institutions, public spaces and/or parks, and on consumer goods, thus showing the social influence and impact this poet has had on the region. Today, it is possible to find schools and universities named after the writer in the Spanish Autonomous Region of Galicia as well as other parts of Spain, Russia, Venezuela (Teatro Rosalía de Castro) and Uruguay also have places that bear her name. Furthermore, there are numerous parks, plazas and streets, cultural associations, prizes granted to people that are intimately linked with the Galician and Spanish languages, libraries, folk groups, choirs, and even a wine with the name Rías Baixas. There is also a plane from the airline Iberia, as well as an aircraft belonging to the Maritime Safety and Rescue Society (Salvamento Marítimo), have been given the name of Rosalía de Castro. Moreover, there are a multitude of monuments, commemorative plaques and sculptures dedicated to her in many parts of the world.

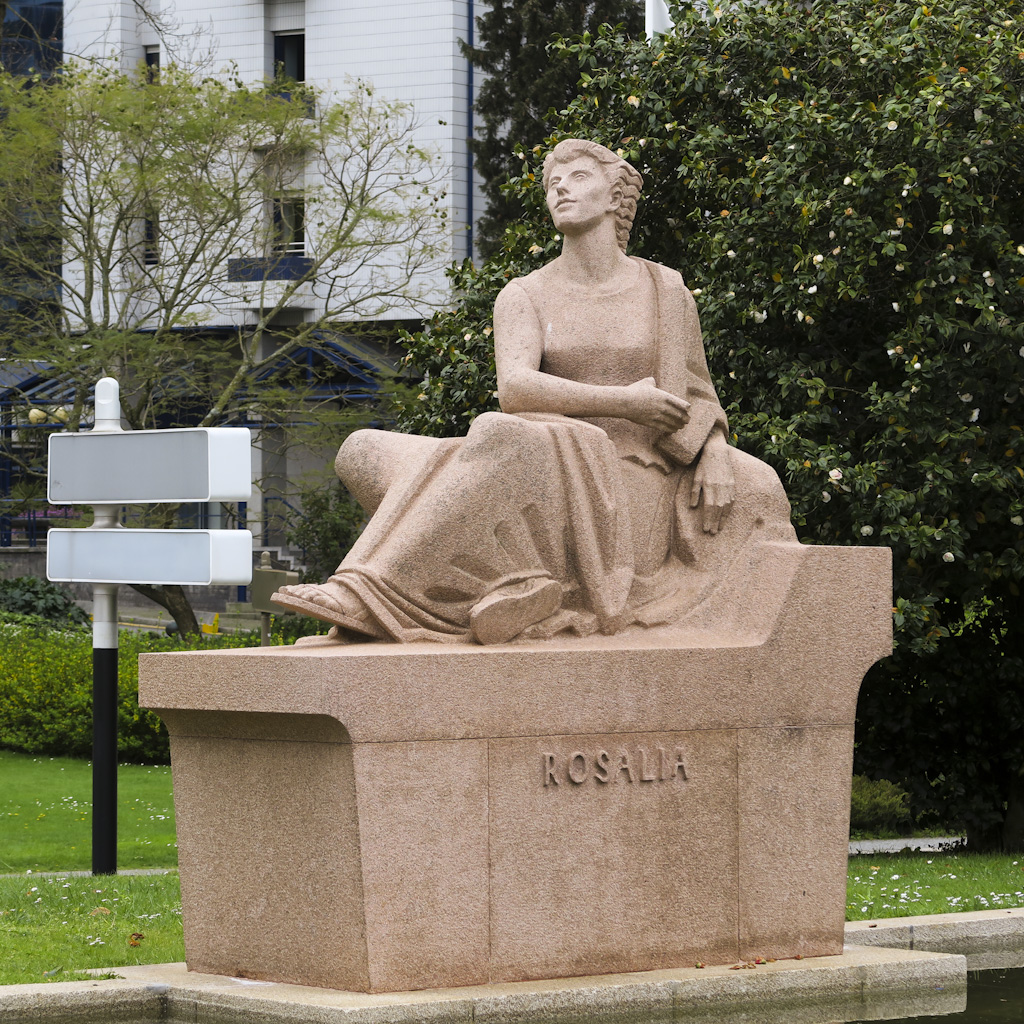
Monument to Rosalía de Castro at Porto, Portugal.

On 23 October 1979, the last of the 500 peseta bills was printed, being that in 1987, this bill was to be substituted by a coin of the same value. The bill had the portrait of Rosalía de Castro displayed on the obverse side, created by Pablo Sampedro Moledo: on the reverse side were the House/Museum of Rosalía located in Padrón and a few handwritten verses from Rosalía de Castro's work Follas Novas. With the printing of this bill, Rosalía de Castro became, excepting Isabella I of Castile, the only non-allegorical female to be placed on the obverse side of a Spanish bill.

In 2019, the International Astronomical Union named the star HD 149143 after de Castro, as part of the NameExoWorlds contest.

== Works ==
Works written by Rosalía de Castro include (each year links to its corresponding year-in-poetry article or year-in-literature article):

=== In Galician ===
Poetry

- Cantares gallegos (1863)
- Follas novas (1880)

Prose

- Contos da miña terra I (1864)

=== In Spanish ===
Poetry

- La Flor (1857)
- A mi madre (1863)
- En las orillas del Sar (1884)

Prose

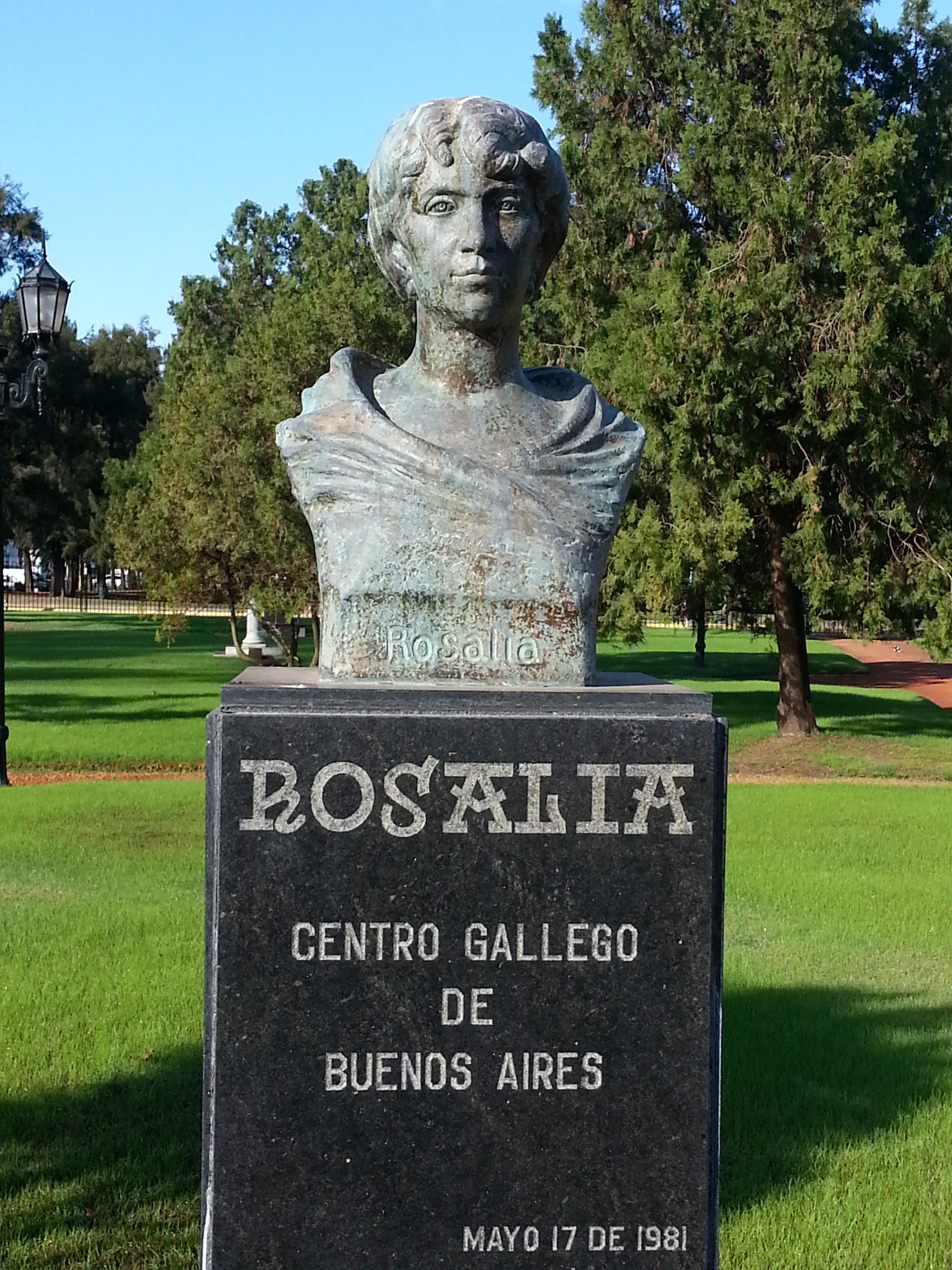
Bust of Rosalía. Paseo de los Poetas, El Rosedal, Parque Tres de Febrero, Buenos Aires.

- La hija del mar (1859)
- Flavio (1861)
- El cadiceño (1863)
- Ruinas (1866)
- Las literatas (1866)
- El caballero de las botas azules (1867)
- El primer loco (1881)
- El domingo de Ramos (1881)
- Padrón y las inundaciones (1881)

== Settings in music ==
- Osvaldo Golijov set "Lua descolorida" in "Three Songs for Soprano and Orchestra" (2002)
- Antón García Abril set Cuatro canciones sobre textos gallegos (1957–1962)
- Octavio Vazquez set "En Cornes" and "Como Chove Miudiño", and wrote two instrumental scenes on "Nosa Señora da Barca" and "Eu Ben Vin Estar o Moucho"
- Adolfo Salazar set three poems for voice and piano in "Tres Poemas de Rosalía de Castro" (1915)
