= Galician Regionalist Association =

Galician Regionalist Association Asociación Regionalista Gallega
- Leader: Manuel Murguía
- Founded: November 1, 1890
- Dissolved: January 15, 1892
- Newspaper: La Patria Gallega
- Ideology: Galicianism; Big tent Völkisch nationalism Autonomism

The Galician Regionalist Association (ARG, Asociación Regionalista Gallega in Spanish language or Asociación Rexionalista Galega in Galician language) was an active regionalist political organization in Galicia between 1890 and 1892.

== History ==
In November 1890, ARG was founded in Santiago de Compostela, under the provisional name of Regionalist Central Committee, chaired by Manuel Murguía, although most of its members came from traditionalism. Among them highlighted Alfredo Brañas, Salvador Cabeza de León, José Tarrío and Juan Barcia Caballero. In 1891 local committees were created in Lugo, A Coruña, Ourense, Pontevedra and Tui formed. In total there was never more than 50 members, being the ARG relatively elitist. In the municipal elections of Santiago de Compostela in 1891, Jose Tarrío and Salvador Cabeza de León were elected town councillors, the first galicianist politicians to be elected to public office in the history of Galicia.

La Patria Gallega (1891-1892) was the official organ of the ARG, directed by Manuel Murguía, and that had a lot of impact in the evolution of galicianist. The most famous action of the ARG was organization of the Floral Games of Tui in 1891, in which Murguía and Alfredo Brañas used the Galician language for the first since the 16th Century at a public event. Some people of the ARG (including Murguía) also started considering Galicia as a nation, not just a region of Spain, clearing the way for the emergence of modern Galician nationalism.

The differences between traditionalists and liberals impeded the consolidation of the organization, although it was very important in the formation of a Galician national sentiment, as the first regionalist political organization that existed in Galicia.
