= Follas novas =

1880 poem collection by Rosalía de Castro

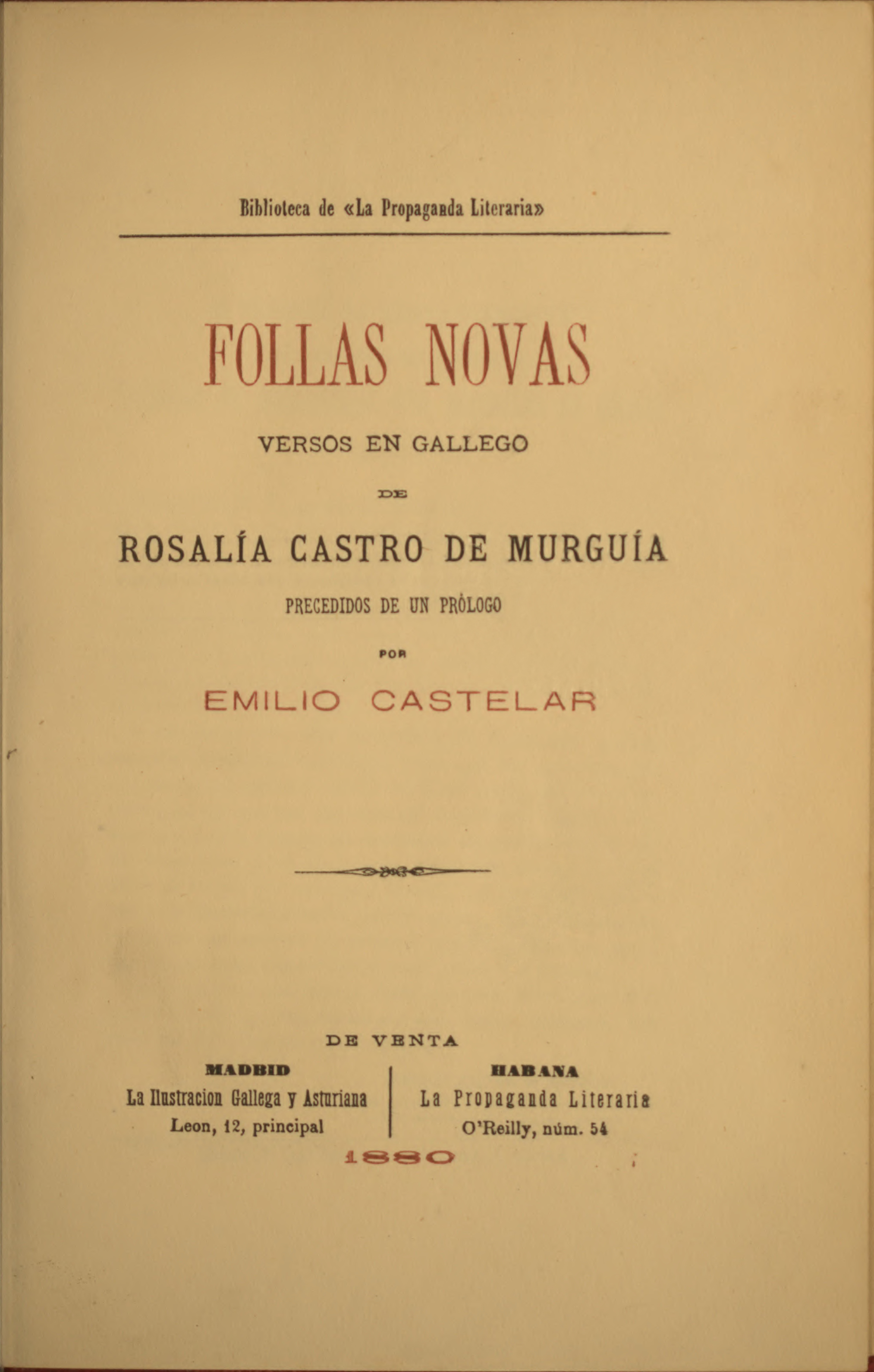
Title page of Follas Novas (1880)

Follas novas (New Leaves) is a collection of poetry by the Galician Rosalía de Castro, published in 1880. It is her second and last collection in the Galician language. The majority of the poems were written during 1869-1870, when the family lived in Simancas, but the collection also includes literary work from the 1870s, part of which had already been published in newspapers. This book is considered one of the fundamental works of Galician literature, which triggered the Galician Rexurdimento.

The collection consists of five books: Vaguedás, Do íntimo, Varia, Da terra and As viuvas dos vivos e as viuvas dos mortos.

Follas novas is considered to be the highlight of Castro's career. It also represents a transitional phase between her first Galician collection Cantares gallegos (1863) and the radical novel En las orillas del Sar written in Castilian Spanish. In addition to romantic poetry, Follas novas contains social comments about the role of women and Galician emigration for economic reasons. The last book of the collection, As viuvas dos vivos e as viuvas dos mortos (Widows of the living and widows of the dead) is about women whose husbands left the country for economic reasons. In the preface, Castro explains that the publication and distribution of the collection was supported by the Galician community in Cuba.

== Additional reading ==
- Kirsti Hooper: Writing Galicia Into the World: New Cartographies, New Poetics, s. 150. Liverpool University Press, 2011. ISBN 9781846316678.
