= Eduardo Pondal =

Galician poet

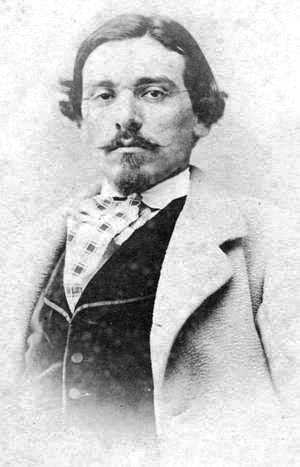
- Pondal in 1859
- Born: Eduardo Maria González-Pondal Abente; February 8, 1835; Ponteceso, Galicia
- Died: March 8, 1917 (aged 82); A Coruña, Galicia
- Occupation: Poet
- Writing career
- Period: Romanticism

Eduardo María González-Pondal Abente (February 8, 1835 – March 8, 1917) was a Galician poet, who wrote in both Galician and Spanish.

== Background ==
Of Hidalgo origin, Pondal was the youngest of a family of seven. From 1844 onwards he studied Latin in a school in Vilela de Nemiña which belonged to his cleric relative, Cristobal Lago. In 1848, he moved to Santiago de Compostela to study Philosophy and, afterwards, Medicine at University.

As a student, he was a regular at Liceo de Santo Agostiño, a place where literary debates took place. There, he was discovered as a poet during the banquet of Conxo. It was a banquet organized by liberal students in 1856 to honor "the third state", and where students rubbed shoulders with laborers. The toasts are retrospectively considered to have an important political meaning.

In 1860, Pondal completed his studies and began working as a doctor for the Spanish Army at Ferrol. He also published A Campana de Anllóns, his first poem in the Galician language.

In 1861, he opted for an official job working for the Crown. He got the job in Asturias, but he left it, and his career as a doctor.

He would soon retire and come back to the house of his family, where he lived with regular trips to Santiago de Compostela and A Coruña (Corunna), where he visited a library called A Cova Céltica, debating with Martínez Salazar, Manuel Murguía, Florencio Vaamonde, Martelo Paumán, Urbano Lugris and others. Through Murguía, Pondal would get to know James Macpherson's poetry, and decided to become the "bardo" (bard) of the Galician nation, becoming the guide and interpreter of the route it would follow.

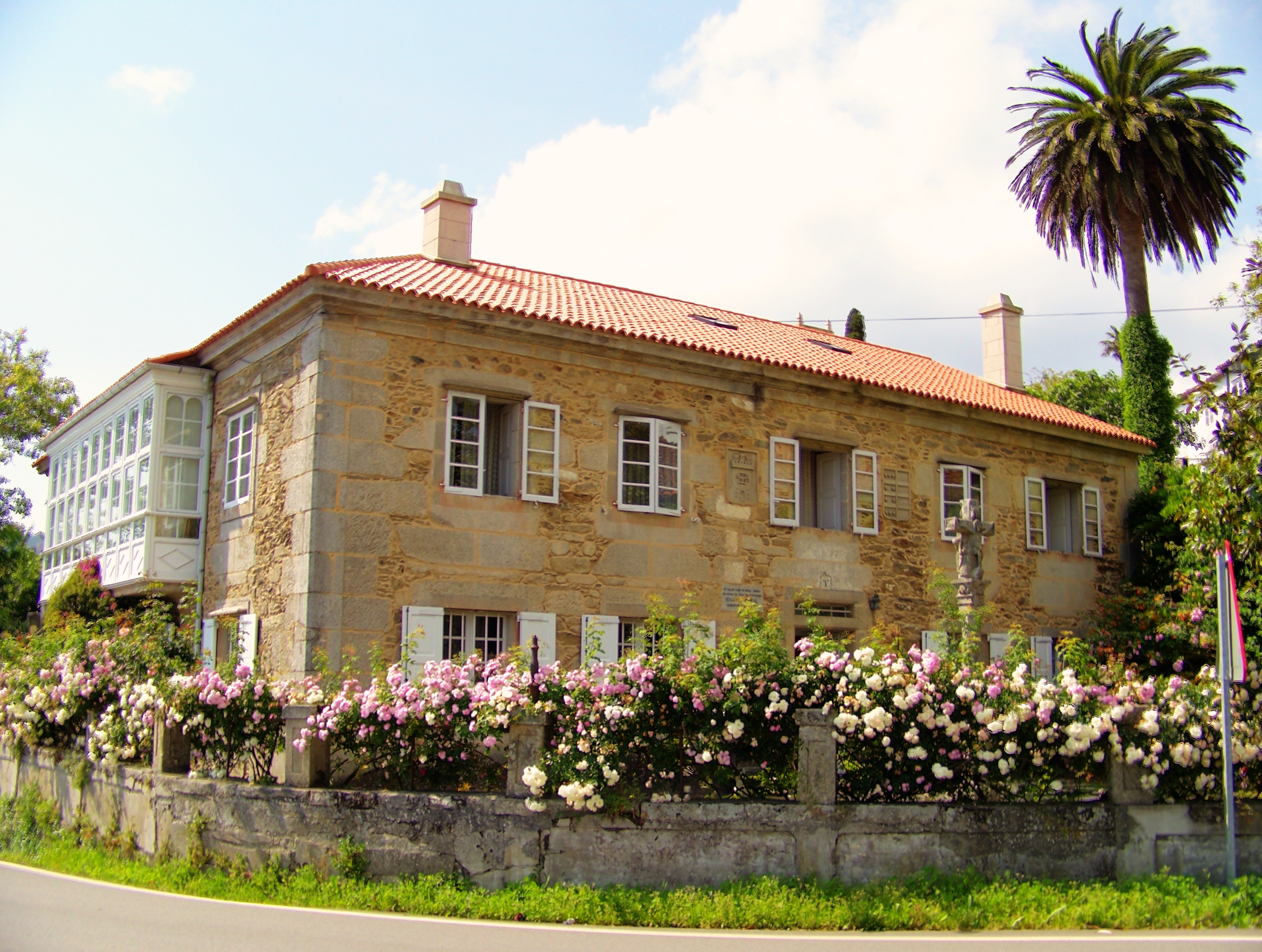
Pondal's birthplace

He published Rumores de los pinos in 1877, a compilation of 21 poems in Galician and Spanish, which would become the basis for Queixumes dos pinos (1886). One of the poems in Galician, "Os pinos" (literally "The Pines") would become the lyrics for the Galician national anthem, with music by Pascual Veiga.

Pondal considered himself a "poet of freedom", wanting to raise his people. He imagined a past of freedom and independence, which he tried to recover with his poetry, renewing History. Galician-Celtic mythology was almost completely lost in those days, so Pondal had to guess and re-invent it, based on Ossian's poetry, quotations from the Leabhar Gabala and Murguia's analysis. Pondal created a fragmentary mythology, using as his archetypes o Heroe (the hero) and o Bardo (the bard). He invented historic characters, like Ourens (trying to create a hero whose name would become the basis for the city of Ourense). Due to the poetic nature of his epic, Pondal's mythology would never become as complete or exhaustive as J. R. R. Tolkien's.

Pondal tried to restore the Galician language in a time in which it lacked social status. Nature and women are the keys of his production. From a linguistic perspective, Pondal tried to mix the populist style of the Galician of his time, with different scholarly terms in the lexicon and syntax.

He tried to write a long epic poem, Os Eoas, based on the discovery of the Americas, but he was never satisfied with his work and only published a first draft in 1858.

Pondal died in La Luguesa hotel in A Coruña on 8 March 1917. He was buried in San Amaro cemetery.

Galician Literature Day (Día das Letras Galegas) was dedicated to Pondal in its third year, 1965.

== Works ==
- 1862: "A Campana de Anllóns (El canto de un Brigante)"
- 1877: Rumores de los pinos
- 1886: Queixumes dos pinos
- 1895: A campana de Anllóns
- 2005: Os Eoas

== Bibliography ==
- "Pondal Abente, Eduardo María". Diccionario enciclopédico galego universal 50. La Voz de Galicia. 2003-2004. p. 10-11. ISBN 84-7680-429-6.
- "Pondal Abente, Eduardo María González". Dicionario biográfico de Galicia 3. Ir Indo. 2010-2011. pp. 120–123.
- "Pondal Abente, Eduardo María". Diciopedia do século 21 3. Do Cumio, Galaxia e do Castro. 2006. p. 1662. ISBN 978-84-8288-942-9.
- "Pondal Abente, Eduardo María González". Enciclopedia Galega Universal 14. Ir Indo. 1999-2002. p. 34-35. ISBN 84-7680-288-9.
- Angueira, A. (1995). De Rosalía a Dieste 33 anos das letras. Xerais. pp. 29–34. ISBN 84-7507-878-8. Prólogo de Fernández del Riego.
- Carballo, R. (1975) [1963]. Historia da Literatura Galega Contemporánea. Galaxia. pp. 235–333. ISBN 84-7154-227-7.
- Fernández del Riego, F. (1971) [1951]. Historia da Literatura Galega (2ª ed.). Vigo: Editorial Galaxia. pp. 101–106.
- Forcadela, Manuel (1988). A harpa e a terra. Unha visión da poesía lírica de Eduardo Pondal. Universitaria. Xerais. ISBN 84-7507-355-7.
- Forcadela, Manuel (2005). "Pondal, Eduardo". Gran Enciclopedia Galega (DVD). El Progreso. ISBN 84-87804-88-8.
- Freixeiro Mato, X. R.; Gómez Sánchez, A. (1998). Historia da lingua galega. A Nosa Terra. ISBN 84-89976-31-7.
- Gómez, A.; Queixas, M. (2001). Historia xeral da literatura galega. A Nosa Terra. p. 148-158. ISBN 84-95350-79-3.
- Martínez Murguía, Manuel (1886). Los precursores. A Coruña, Biblioteca Gallega, La Voz de Galicia.
- Méndez Ferrín, Xosé Luis (1984). De Pondal a Novoneyra. Edicións Xerais de Galicia. ISBN 84-7507-139-2.
- Pena, X. R. e Forcadela, Manuel (2005). Estudos sobre Os Eoas, Santiago de Compostela, Sotelo Blanco.
- Pena, X. R. (2014). Historia da Literatura Galega II. De 1853 a 1916. O Rexurdimento. Xerais. pp. 251–295. ISBN 978-84-9914-764-2.
- Queizán, María Xosé (1998). Misoxinia e racismo na poesía de Pondal. Edicións Laiovento. ISBN 84-89896-29-1.
- Ricón Virulegio, Amado (1981). Eduardo Pondal. Vigo: Editorial Galaxia. ISBN 978-84-7154-384-4.
- Ricón Virulegio, Amado (1985). Estética poética de Eduardo Pondal. Ediciós do Castro.
- Vilavedra, D., ed. (2000). Pondal Abente, Eduardo. Galaxia. ISBN 84-8288-019-5.
