= Valentín Lamas Carvajal =

Spanish journalist

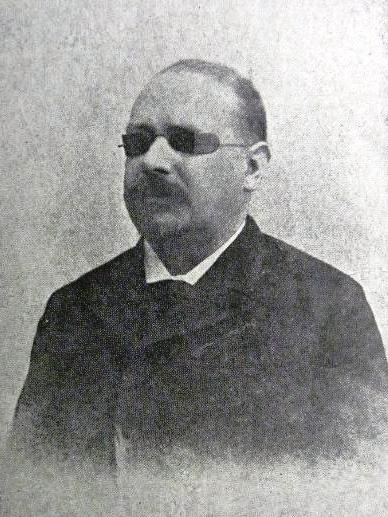
- Born: November 1, 1849; Ourense, Spain
- Died: November 4, 1906 (aged 57); Ourense, Kingdom of Spain
- Burial place: San Francisco de Ourense Cemetery
- Education: University of Santiago de Compostela
- Occupations: Journalist, poet
- Spouse: Amalia Rosina Sánchez Gómez
- Children: 6, including Modesto Lamas Sánchez

Signature
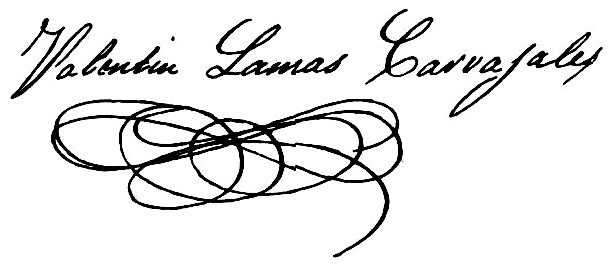

Valentín Lamas Carvajal (1849–1906) was a Spanish journalist. He was one of the founders of Royal Galician Academy.

He studied high school in his hometown and in 1870 he moved to Santiago de Compostela to study medicine that he failed to finish due to an eye disease that would eventually leave him blind.

== Work ==
- Espiñas, follas e frores (1875)
- Saudades gallegas (1880)
- Gallegada (1887)
- Catecismo do labrego (1889)
- A musa das aldeas (1890)
