= Manuel Murguía =

Spanish author (1833–1923)

Manuel Murguia
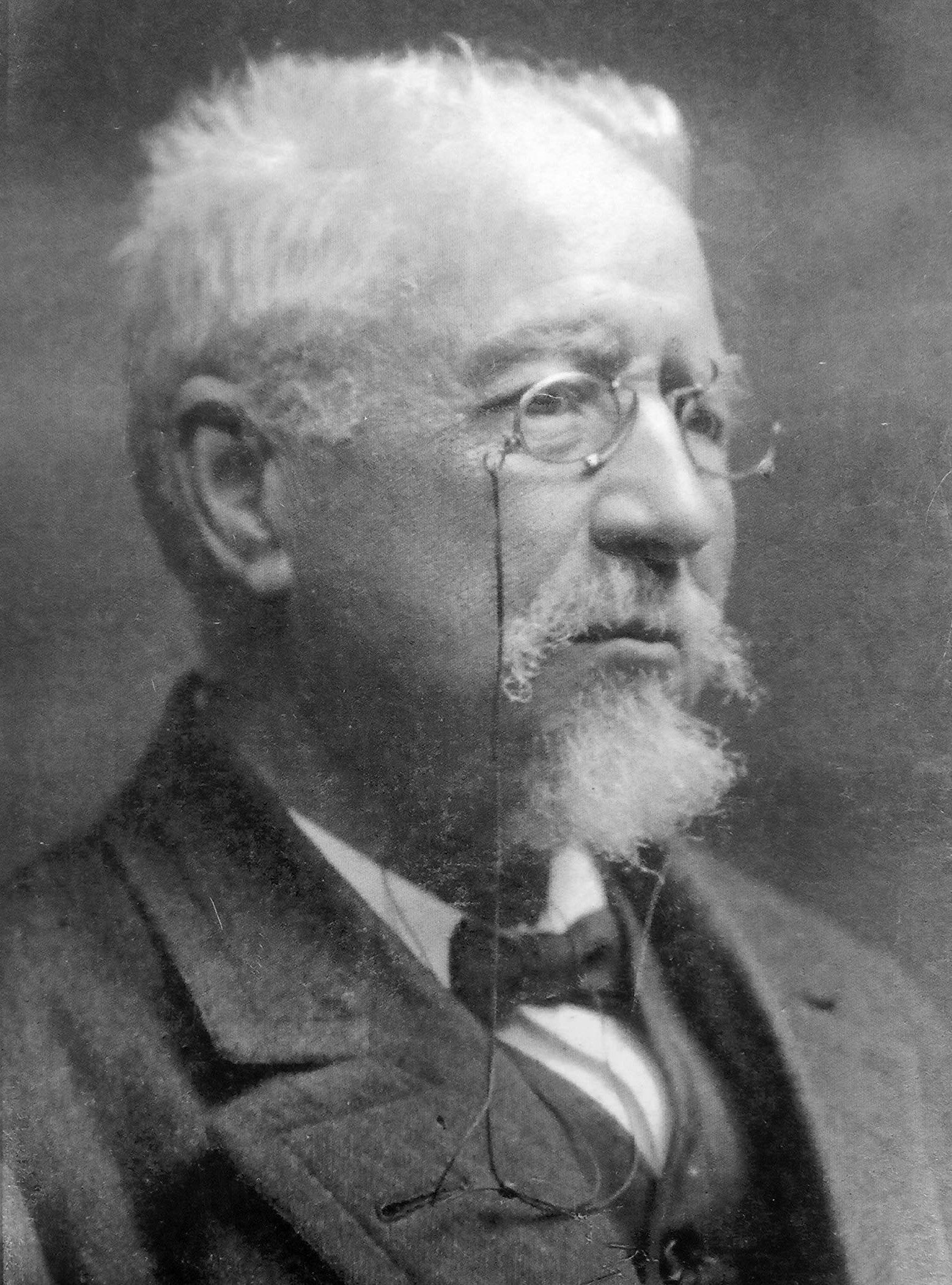
- Born: Manuel Antonio Martínez Murguía; 17 May 1833; Arteixo (A Coruña), Spain
- Died: 2 February 1923 (aged 89); A Coruña, Spain
- Citizenship: Spanish
- Spouse: Rosalía de Castro
- Writing career
- Language: Galician, Spanish

Manuel Antonio Martínez Murguía (17 May 1833 – 2 February 1923) was a Galician journalist and historian who created the Real Academia Galega. He was one of the main figures in Galician Rexurdimento movement. He is also remembered as Rosalía de Castro's husband, publisher and main supporter.

== Life ==
Manuel Murguía was born on 17 May 1833 in Arteixo (A Coruña), in Galicia (Spain). His father was a chemist.

Being at A Coruña, a child Manuel Murguía witnessed the liberal insurrection of locals against the central power on 23 April 1846. This happening ended with the execution of the Mártires de Carral (The Martyrs of Carral). It all caused an important ideological impact on Murguía, who wrote about that later on in his article La Voz de Galicia (The Voice of Galicia).

Manuel Murguía studied philosophy, and pharmacy (as was his father's wish), at Santiago de Compostela. However, Murguía had a great interest on literature and history, so he finally gave up his studies to work as a writer and researcher. He used to go to Liceo de la Juventud, the cultural center on Santiago, meeting other students and intellectual people, including Eduardo Pondal, Aurelio Aguirre and Rosalía de Castro.

On 1 June 1854 Murguía published his first work in Galician language, Nena das Soidades (Girl of Loneliness). He then began working as a freelance writer in journals and magazines, getting a measure of success. With it, up-and-coming Murguía would publish other works like Mi madre Antonia (My mother, Antonia), Los Lirios Blancos (The White Irises) and El Ángel de la Muerte (Angel of Death). He would then become one of the literary promises of his time.

Murguía went to Madrid, where he became friends with authors like Gustavo Adolfo Bécquer; he also began a romantic relationship with Rosalía de Castro, whom he married in Madrid on 10 October 1858. From the very beginning, Murguía encouraged de Castro's literary interests and the publishing of her works. Particularly, de Castro's work Cantares Gallegos will be considered the beginning of the Rexurdimento (Galician literature renaissance).

After getting a great success, Murguía left his creative job and began a full-time work on historical research and its popularization. He also tried to extend his own political ideas. This is considered a milestone on the Rexurdimento.

Once his first daughter was born, Murguía published La Primera Luz (The First Light), a book of school texts about history and geography. The Spanish Ministry of Promotion encouraged to use of this book to teach in Galicia schools.

Murguía published important works, including Diccionario de escritores gallegos (Dictionary of Galician writers) in 1862. He then moved to Lugo in 1865, and then he published Historia de Galicia (History of Galicia).

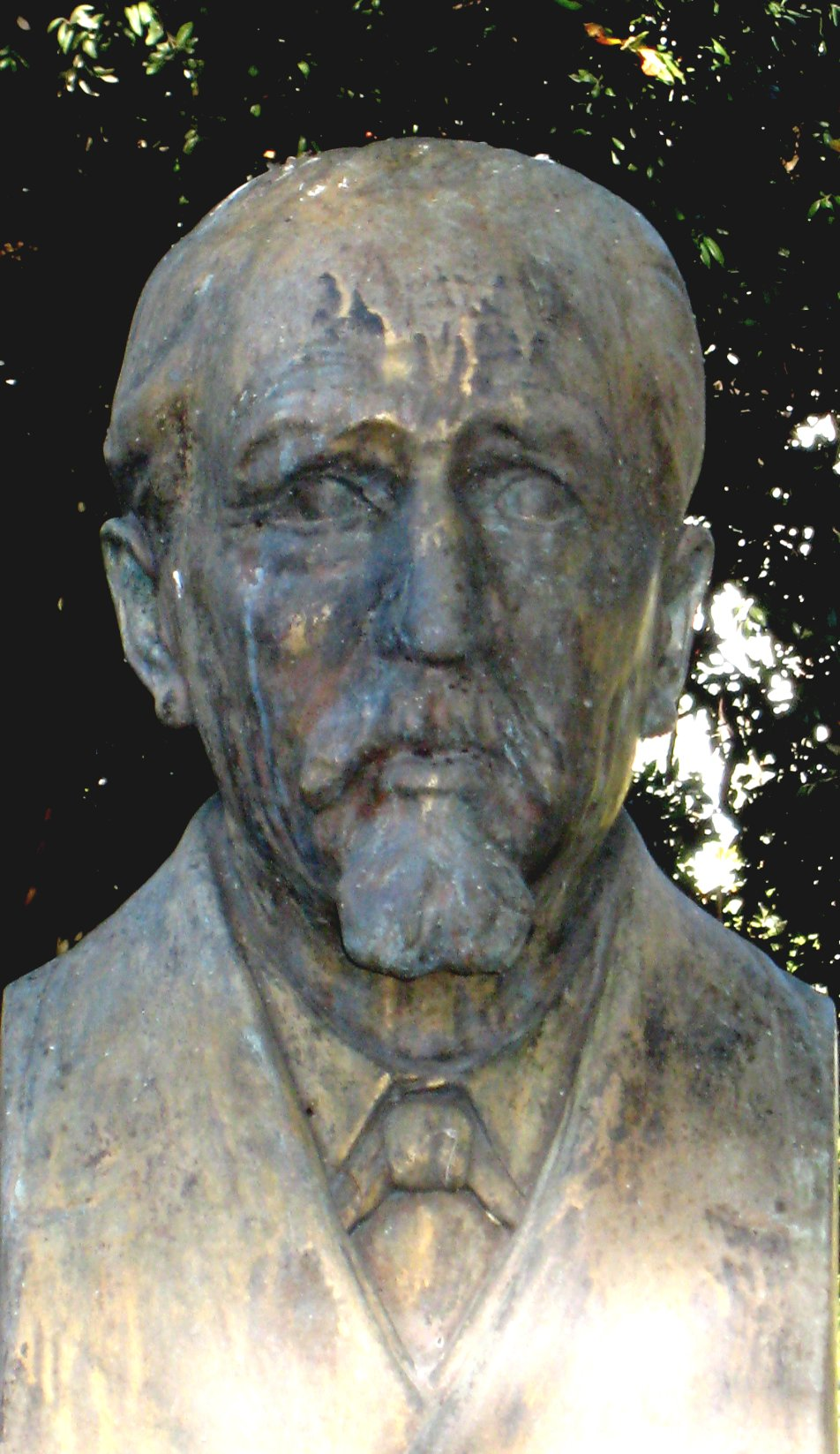
Manuel Murguía.

He was named Chief of the Arquivo Xeral de Galicia (General Archives of Galicia) in 1870, and fifteen years later he became Cronista Xeral do Reino (Feature Writer of the Kingdom), all the while writing and publishing different works.

In 1890, Murguía became the co-editor of La Patria Gallega (Galicia Native Country), a journal which included the first keys of the Galician nationalism.

When he was 72 years old, Murguía decided to create an Academy of the Galician Language. He shared his idea with other writers who met on Coruñan book store A Cova Céltica. This Galician Academy became a reality on August 25, 1906. Murguía also wanted to create a dictionary of Galician language, as he felt Galician vocabulary was scarce; he even suggested that his work in Galician could not be greater because of the absence of this dictionary.

Murguía died on 2 February 1923 on A Coruña.

One hundred years after he published the book Cantares Gallegos, in 1963, the date was commemorated with the Día das Letras Galegas (Galician Literature Day). Since then, May 17 would be dedicated to a different writer in Galician language every year. It was dedicated to Rosalía de Castro on its first installment in 1963. Afterwards, Murguía's work was recognized when the Día das Letras Galegas was dedicated to him in 2000.

== Works ==
(Not including articles on the gazette of the Real Academia Gallega).

=== Books ===
- La primera luz, Vigo, Juan Compañel, 1860.
- Diccionario de escritores gallegos, Vigo, Juan Compañel, 1862.
- De las guerras de Galicia en el siglo XV y de su verdadero carácter, A Coruña, 1861.
- Historia de Galicia, T. I, Lugo, Soto Freire,1865, T. II, Lugo, Soto Freire, 1866, T. III, A Coruña, Libr. de A. Martínez Salazar, 1888, Tomo IV, A Coruña, Libr. de E. Carré Aldao, 1891, T.V, A Coruña, 1911.
- Memoria relativa al Archivo Regional de Galicia, A Coruña, 1871.
- Biografía del P. M. Fr. Benito Gerónimo Feijóo, Santiago, Est. Tip. de El Diario, 1876.
- El foro, Madrid, Libr. de Bailly Bailliere, 1882.
- El arte en Santiago durante el siglo XVIII y noticia de los artistas que florecieron en dicha ciudad y centuria, Madrid, Est. Tip. de Fernando Fé, 1884.
- Los Precursores, A Coruña, Latorre y Martínez Editores, Biblioteca Gallega, 1886.
- Galicia, Barcelona, Daniel Cortezo, 1888.
- El regionalismo gallego, La Habana, Imp. La Universal, 1889.
- En prosa, (Contén a novela El puñalito), A Coruña, 1895.
- Don Diego Gelmírez, A Coruña, Imprenta y Librería de Carré, 1898.
- Los trovadores gallegos, A Coruña, Imp. de Ferrer, 1905.
- Apuntes históricos de la provincia de Pontevedra, folletín de La Temporada, Mondariz, Imp. del Establecimiento, 1913.
- Politica y sociedad en Galicia, Madrid, Akal, Arealonga, 8, 1974, ed. de X. Alonso Montero

=== Tales ===
- Un can-can de Musard (tale), 1853.
- Un artista (tale), Madrid, 1853; co título de Ignotus in Los Precursores (1886).
- Desde el cielo (novel), Madrid, La Iberia, 1854; Vigo, Imp. de La Oliva, 1856; Madrid, Biblioteca de Escritores Gallegos, 1910.
- Luisa (tale), Madrid, 1855 e A Coruña, 1862.
- La Virgen de la Servilleta, (novel), Madrid, 1855.
- El regalo de boda (novel), La Iberia, Madrid, 1855.
- Mi madre Antonia, (novel), Vigo, La Oliva, 1856.
- Don Diego Gelmírez,(novel) Madrid, La Oliva, 1856.
- El ángel de la muerte, (novel), Madrid, La Crónica, 1857.
- La mujer de fuego (novel), Madrid, 1859.

=== Poetry ===
- "Nena d’as soledades" (poem), La Oliva, 27-2-1856.
- "Madrigal" (poem), La Oliva, 8-3-1856.
- "La flor y el aire" (poem), La Oliva, 19-3-1856.
- "A una paloma" (poem), La Oliva, 3-5-1856.
- "A las ruínas del Castillo de Altamira" (poem), La Oliva, 31-5-1856.
- "En un Álbum", (poem), La Oliva, 31-5-1856.
- "Al partir" (poem), Galicia (A Coruña), 1862, páx. 39.
- Three poems ("Madrigal", "Nena d’as soledades" and "Gloria") in anthology El Álbum de la Caridad, A Coruña, 1862.
- "Sueños dorados" (poem), en García Acuña (177) e antes no Álbum de El Miño.
- "Ildara de Courel", (poem), en García Acuña (177-178).
- "Soneto de Pardo de Cela", (poem), en García Acuña (179).
- "Los versos fueron mi ilusión primera" (1903 poem), en Naya (1950: 104).
