= Celanova =

- Municipality
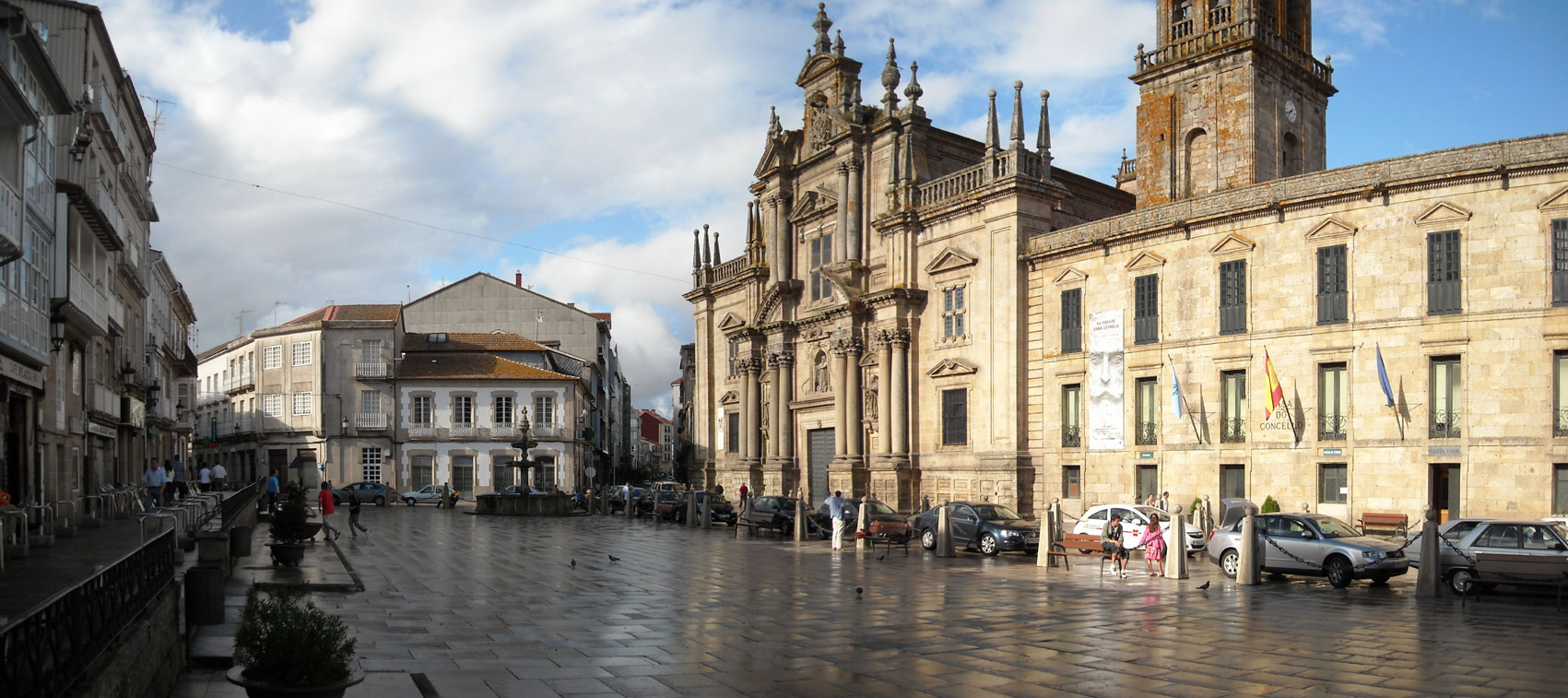
- Mayor square.

- Coat of arms

- Location in Spain
- Coordinates: 42°09′07″N 7°57′27″W
- Country: Spain
- Autonomous community: Galicia
- Province: Ourense
- Comarca: Terra de Celanova

Government
  - Alcalde: Antonio Puga Rodríguez (Celanova Decide)

Area
  - Total: 67.31 km^{2} (25.99 sq mi)
- Elevation: 530 m (1,740 ft)

Population (2025-01-01)
  - Total: 5,723
  - Density: 85.02/km^{2} (220.2/sq mi)
- Demonym(s): Celanovés, -esa
- Time zone: UTC+1 (CET)
  - Summer (DST): UTC+2 (CEST)
- Postal code: 32800
- Official language(s): Spanish and Galician
- Website: Official website

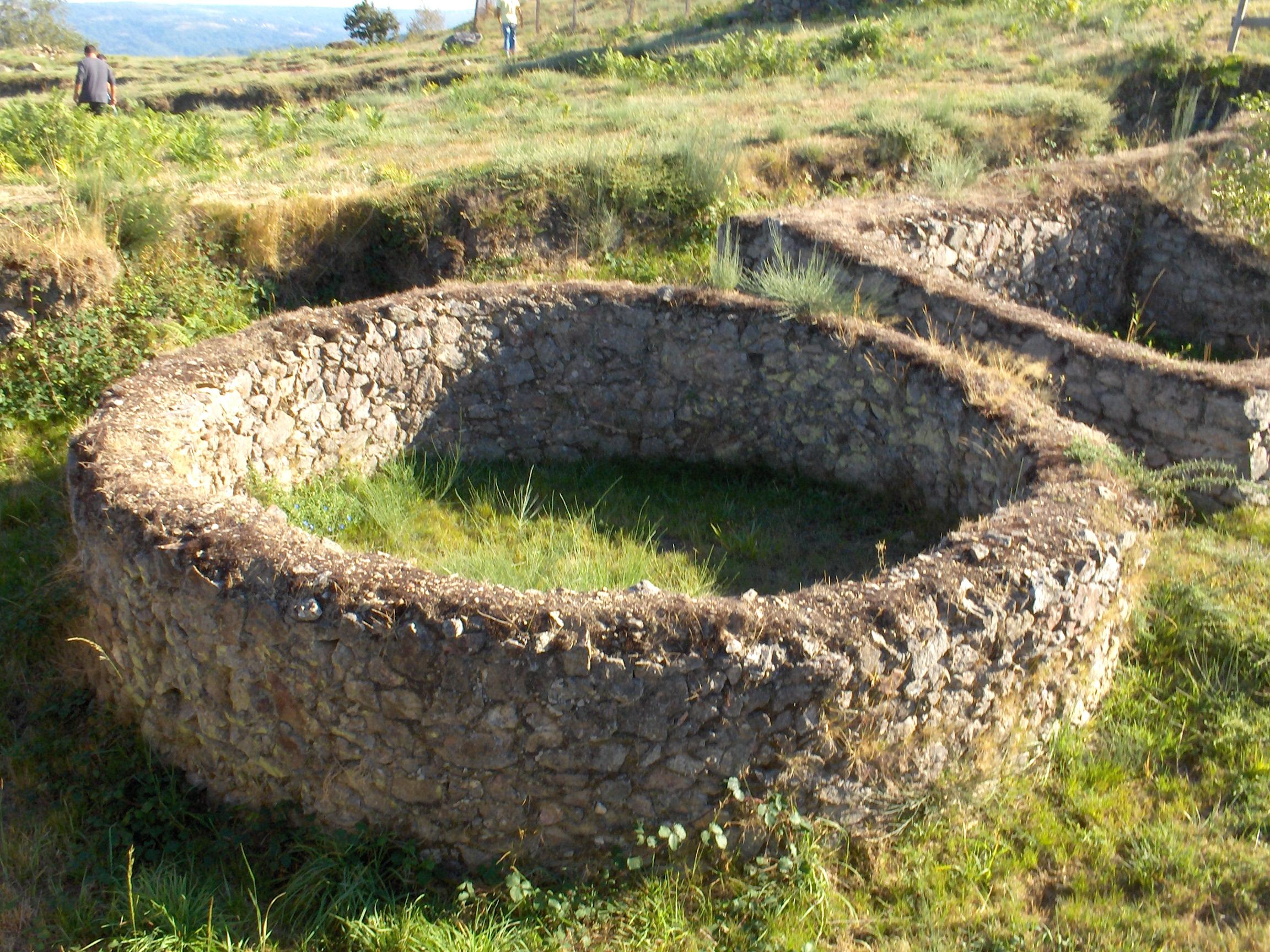
Castromao, in Celanova.

Celanova is a municipality in the province of Ourense, in the autonomous community of Galicia, Spain. It belongs to the comarca of Terra de Celanova. Situated near the border with Portugal, the municipality is bordered by Ramirás, Cartelle, A Merca, A Bola, Verea and Quintela de Leirado.

The Arnoia river crosses the southern limits of the township. The municipality has 6,020 inhabitants. The provincial capital Ourense is located 23 km away on highway N-540 (Ourense to Portugal via Lindoso).

The Monastery of San Salvador de Celanova is the most important building in a well-preserved historical center. It was founded by St. Rudesind (San Rosendo) in 936. The nave is considered the most perfect Galician Baroque church. In the garden of the monastery can be found the pre-Romanesque chapel of San Miguel, one of the oldest in Spain.

The town preserves ancient streets, with several houses that display coats of arms. One of these mansions was the birthplace of the great poet of the Galician Rexurdimento (Rebirth), Manuel Curros Enríquez.

Nearby can be found the castro (pre-Roman citadel) of Castromao. The visitor can still see the circular dwellings and defensive walls built by the Romans.

A few kilometres from the town lies the village of Vilanova dos Infantes with a medieval tower from the 14th century. It belonged to the Counts of Monterrey. Close to this perfectly restored village is the sanctuary of La Virgen del Cristal, in which can be seen a strange transparent stone, perhaps a meteorite, containing what some believe to be the image of the Virgin Mary.

== International relations ==
=== Twin towns — Sister cities ===
Celanova is twinned with:

- Guadix, Andalusia, Spain
- Rubí, Catalonia, Spain
- Santo Tirso, Portugal

== See also ==
- Monastery of San Salvador de Celanova
