= Estremera Prison =

Prison in Spain

Coordinates: 40.11540°N 3.07647°W

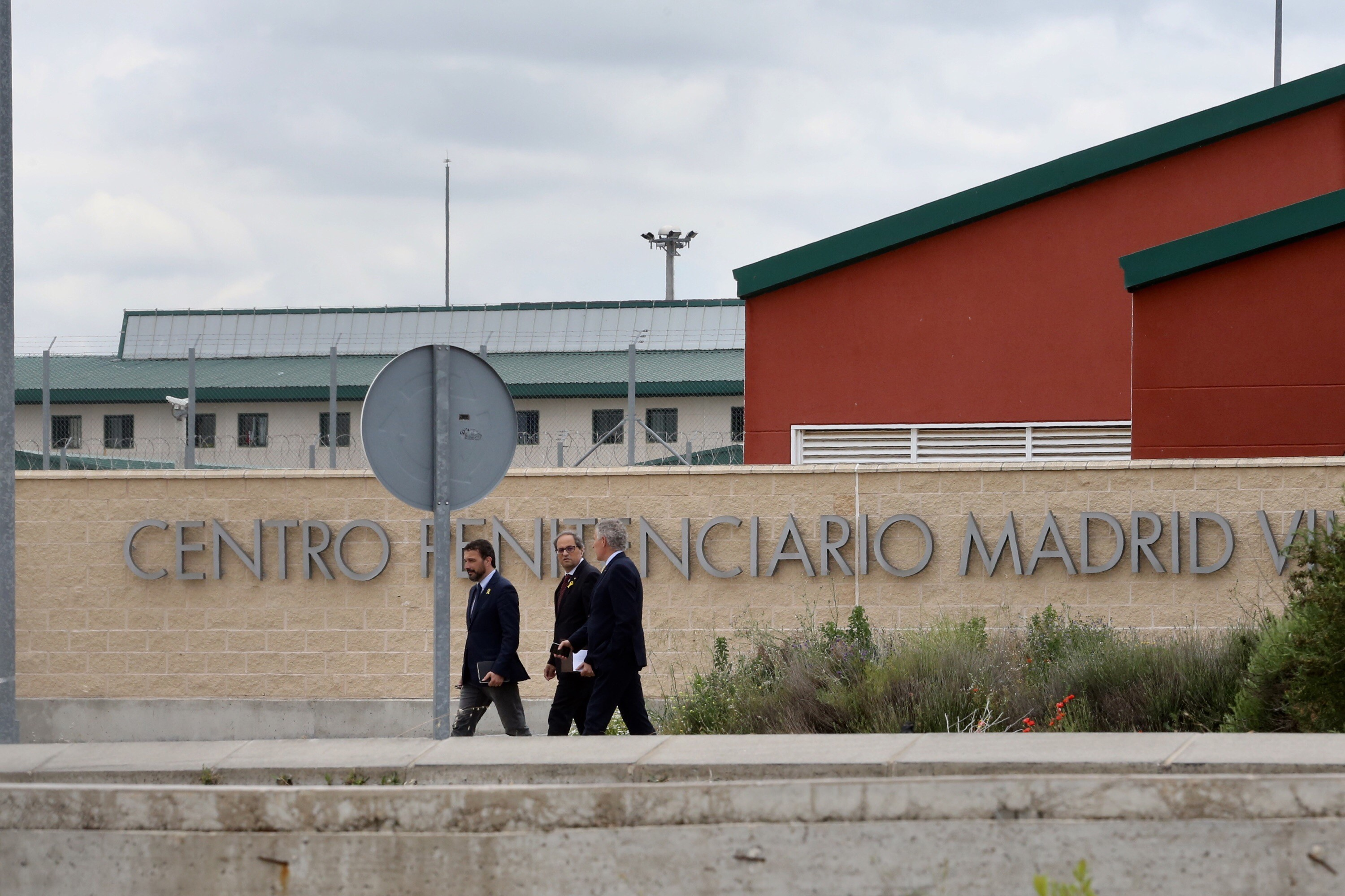
Catalan politician Quim Torra (centre) visiting jailed colleagues in March 2018

The Centro Penitenciaro Madrid VII, better known as Estremera Prison (Spanish: Prisión de Estremera) is a prison in Estremera, in the Community of Madrid, Spain.

== History ==
The prison was opened on 15 July 2008 by Ministry of the Interior Alfredo Pérez Rubalcaba, and took in inmates from September. It was the seventh prison in the region and first to be built in the 21st century. Built to alleviate overcrowding at the other six, it has 1,214 cells including 74 that are high-security; it replaced the one in Aranjuez (1,157) as the largest prison in the region. Architect Marta Cao designed it with colours, gardens and solar panels to create a less uncomfortable atmosphere. Women are also detained at the prison, in segregated blocks.

By November 2017, its capacity was recorded as 1,500. It cost €100 million to build.

In April 2020, it was reported to be the prison most affected by COVID-19, with 15 inmates and four workers infected. In November 2020, staff were formally investigated for alleged abuses. The prison had received 40 allegations of torture in the last five years.

== Notable inmates ==
- Patrick Nogueira, Brazilian serving three life sentences plus 25 years for murdering four family members in 2016. Held in solitary confinement wing. Moved in November 2021 after being beaten by inmates.
- Torbe, Spanish pornographer, served six months of pre-trial detention in 2016 for alleged sex trafficking.
- Francisco Granados, People's Party politician in the Community of Madrid, served 31 months of pre-trial detention for alleged financial crimes. He had assisted in the opening of the prison.
- Oriol Junqueras, Raül Romeva, Joaquim Forn, Jordi Turull, Josep Rull, Carles Mundó and Santi Vila. Catalan separatist politicians arrested over the 2017 Catalan independence referendum.
- Francisco Javier García Gaztelu. ETA commander known as "Txapote", sentenced to over 500 years in prison for assassinations of figures including Miguel Ángel Blanco and Gregorio Ordóñez. Transferred to Estremera in March 2021.
