= Let Txapote vote for you =

Spanish political slogan

"Let Txapote vote for you" (Spanish: ¡Que te vote Txapote!; full version: ¡Que te vote Txapote, Sánchez!, "Let Txapote vote for you, Sánchez!") is a political slogan that is popular among the political right and far-right in Spain during the months prior to the 2023 general elections. It is commonly used against Spanish Prime Minister Pedro Sánchez and mentions the ETA terrorist Francisco Javier García Gaztelu (nicknamed "Txapote").

== Political context ==
After the general elections of November 2019 and the start of the 14th legislature, acting Prime Minister Pedro Sánchez (PSOE) required the abstention of the leading political parties of the nationalist left, the Catalan ERC and Basque EH Bildu, in order to form his second government during the January 2020 parliamentary session. This gesture, among other minor arrangements with EH Bildu, was a central element of criticism by the Spanish political right (mainly the People's Party and Vox).

Francisco Javier García Gaztelu, nicknamed "Txapote", was one of the main leaders of the Basque terrorist group ETA. He has been in prison since 2005 after being accused of committing more than a dozen murders, including those of Miguel Ángel Blanco, Gregorio Ordóñez, and Fernando Buesa.

== Origin of phrase ==
Although it does not have a fully identified origin, its first media appearance dates from September 3, 2022, when, in a meeting between Pedro Sánchez and the public in Seville, an anonymous member of Solidaridad (a local Union tied to the Vox party), raised a banner at the meeting that read Que te vote Txapote ("Let Txapote vote for you"). Days later, Jorge Buxadé, vice president of Vox, used the phrase in a press conference.

The slogan would reach its media zenith on January 25, 2023, when the Hablando Claro television program was broadcasting live from Cazalegas (near Toledo). The topic to be discussed was the presence of a private traffic radar used by the city council, for which reason a "victim" of the radar was going to be interviewed. The interviewee was José María "Chema" de la Cierva, a photographer linked to the extreme right, son of the historian and Suárez minister Ricardo de la Cierva. Chema blurted out: "Let Txapote vote for you, Sánchez, let Txapote vote for you." and continued "The media at the service of the people! Let Chapote vote for you, Sánchez. Socialist, son of a bitch, mass murderer, fuck you! Fuck everyone, socialists, red shit, fuck you!" After this, the signal was cut and returned to the set, and presenter Lourdes Maldonado.

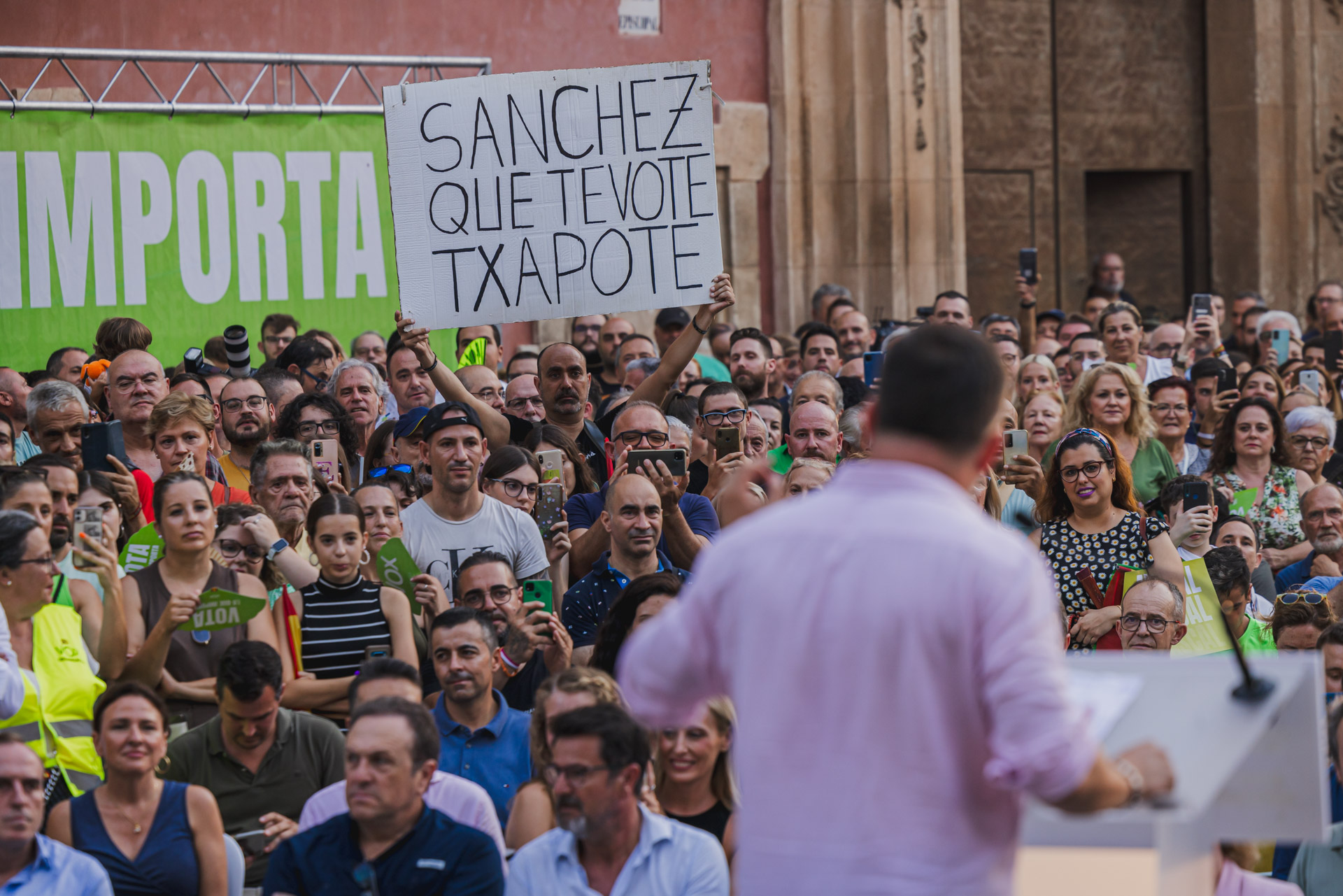
Rally of Santiago Abascal, leader of Vox, in Murcia, where a supporter carries a sign with the slogan "Let Txapote vote for you Sanchez"

De la Cierva was recording what happened with his mobile phone and later published the video, appearing after the broadcast was cut off to launch a series of insults and death threats at the Televisión Española team. The scene quickly became an internet phenomenon, especially on Twitter.

The Vox communication team tried to sign Chema de la Cierva for the electoral campaign of the local and regional elections to be held the following May, but the contract was not finalized. On February 2, 2023, in a plenary session of the Madrid Assembly, the president of the Community of Madrid Isabel Díaz Ayuso (PP) used the slogan in a parliamentary intervention addressed to the PSOE. Consuelo Ordóñez, sister of politician Gregorio Ordóñez assassinated by Txapote in 1993, condemned Diaz Ayuso's use of the slogan. The use of the phrase would grow throughout the campaign for the municipal and regional elections. The day of the election, during an interview with the media, Pedro Sánchez was heckled at the gates of his polling station.

== 2023 General election campaign ==
The usage of the slogan increased during the pre-campaign and campaign for the general elections of July 23, 2023. It would come from positions close to the two main political parties of the Spanish right (PP and Vox) or directly from them. During the celebration of the Sanfermines in Pamplona at the beginning of July, the live broadcast of Televisión Española was interrupted on numerous occasions with the cry of "Let Txapote vote for you, Sánchez".

On July 10 in the debate organized by Atresmedia that pitted Sánchez against PP president Alberto Núñez Feijóo, Sánchez asked Feijóo if he condemned the use of the slogan. Feijóo did not give a clear answer, leading Basque parties to refuse to negotiate potential support for his bid for the prime ministership. As its use increased, the first criticisms also appeared. On July 11, 2023, the Collective of Victims of Terrorism, the Fernando Buesa Foundation, and several independent victims asked not to use the slogan as they considered it "a trivialization of terrorism and terrorists". The use of the slogan, however, divided the victims of terrorism, with María del Mar Blanco, sister of Txapote's victim Miguel Ángel Blanco, and many others openly supporting its use.

Most of the Spanish political spectrum ended up taking position over the phrase. Borja Sémper, spokesman for the Popular Party, acknowledged that the expression caused him discomfort. The Basque Nationalist Party, through Aitor Esteban, criticized the use of the slogan as "hurtful", but said that it was just as hurtful that EH Bildu was fielding convicted ETA members in its lists. The head of the EH Bildu list for Guipúzcoa, Mertxe Aizpurua, described the use of the slogan as "undignified".

On July 20, 2023, the Central Electoral Board stated that according to Article 93 of the Organic Law of the General Electoral Regime, wearing T-shirts bearing this slogan on election day would be considered electoral propaganda and was therefore forbidden. The information was a response to a query made from Jaén due to a campaign on social networks encouraging voters to go to the polling stations wearing T-shirts screen-printed with the slogan alongside the Spanish coat of arms.
