= Diego Gago =

Spanish politician (born 1987)

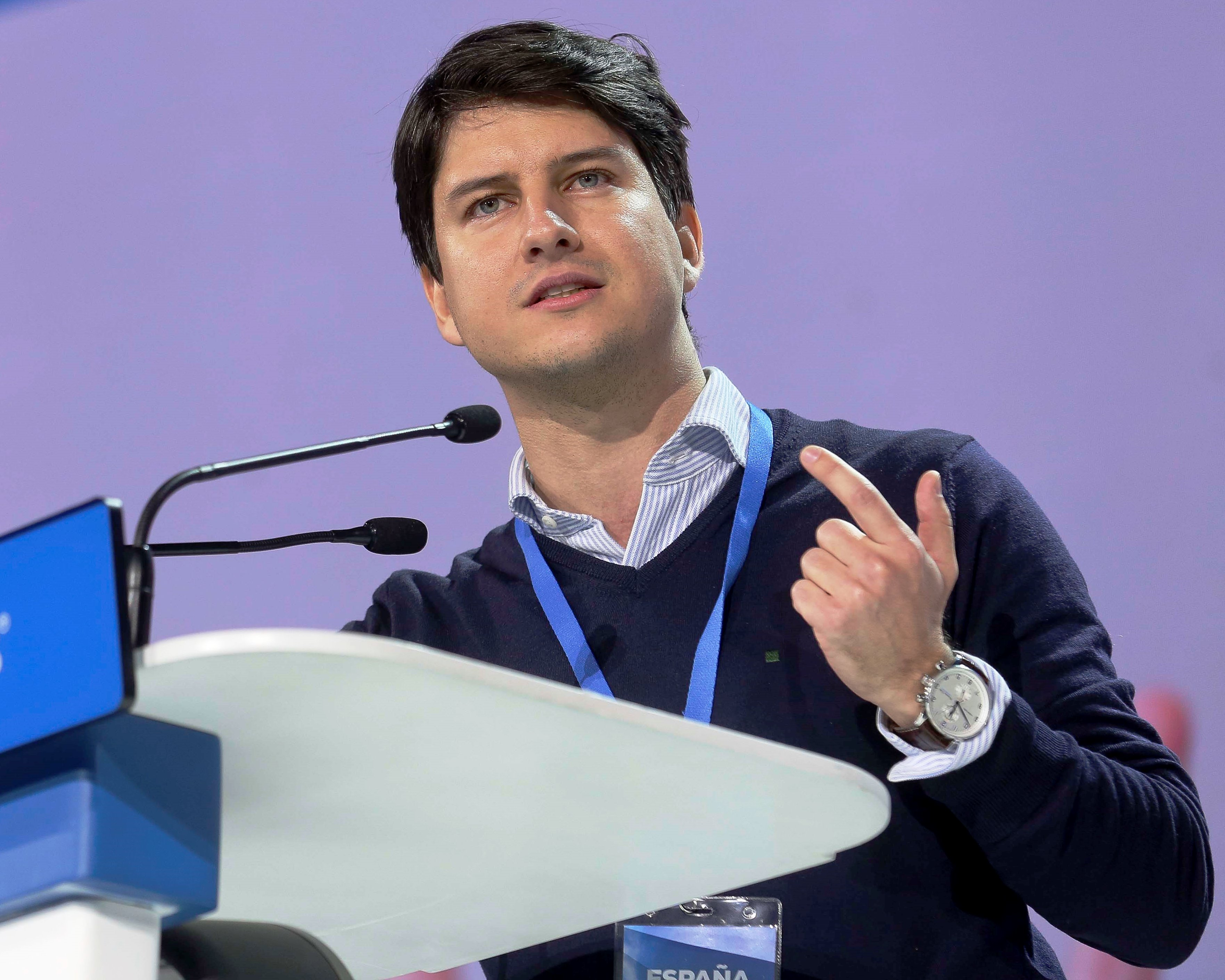

Diego José Gago Bugarín (born 8 September 1987) is a Spanish former politician. As a member of the People's Party (PP), he was a city councillor in Pontevedra in Galicia from 2015 to 2019, and a member of the Congress of Deputies from 2019 to 2023. He was the president of the New Generations of the People's Party (NNGG) from 2017 to 2021.

== Biography ==
Born in Vigo in Galicia, Gago graduated in business law from the University of Vigo and has a master's degree as a tax advisor. Already president of the New Generations of the People's Party (NNGG) in his home region having taken 91% of the vote in 2014, he was number two on the People's Party (PP) list for Pontevedra in the 2015 Spanish local elections. Seven members of the party were elected to the city council, forming the opposition as 15 were voted from the Socialists' Party of Galicia (PSdeG).

In March 2017, Gago was elected unopposed as the new national president of NNGG, replacing Beatriz Jurado who had passed the organisation's maximum age to run again. He was placed second on the PP list for the April 2019 Spanish general election in the Pontevedra constituency, being one of two party members elected by the constituency; he was the second of three elected in the November election. In April 2021, he passed presidency of the NNGG to Beatriz Fanjul.

Gago left public office in June 2023, when he joined the consultancy firm beBartlet as director of political strategy.
