= Borja Sémper =

Spanish politician (born 1976)

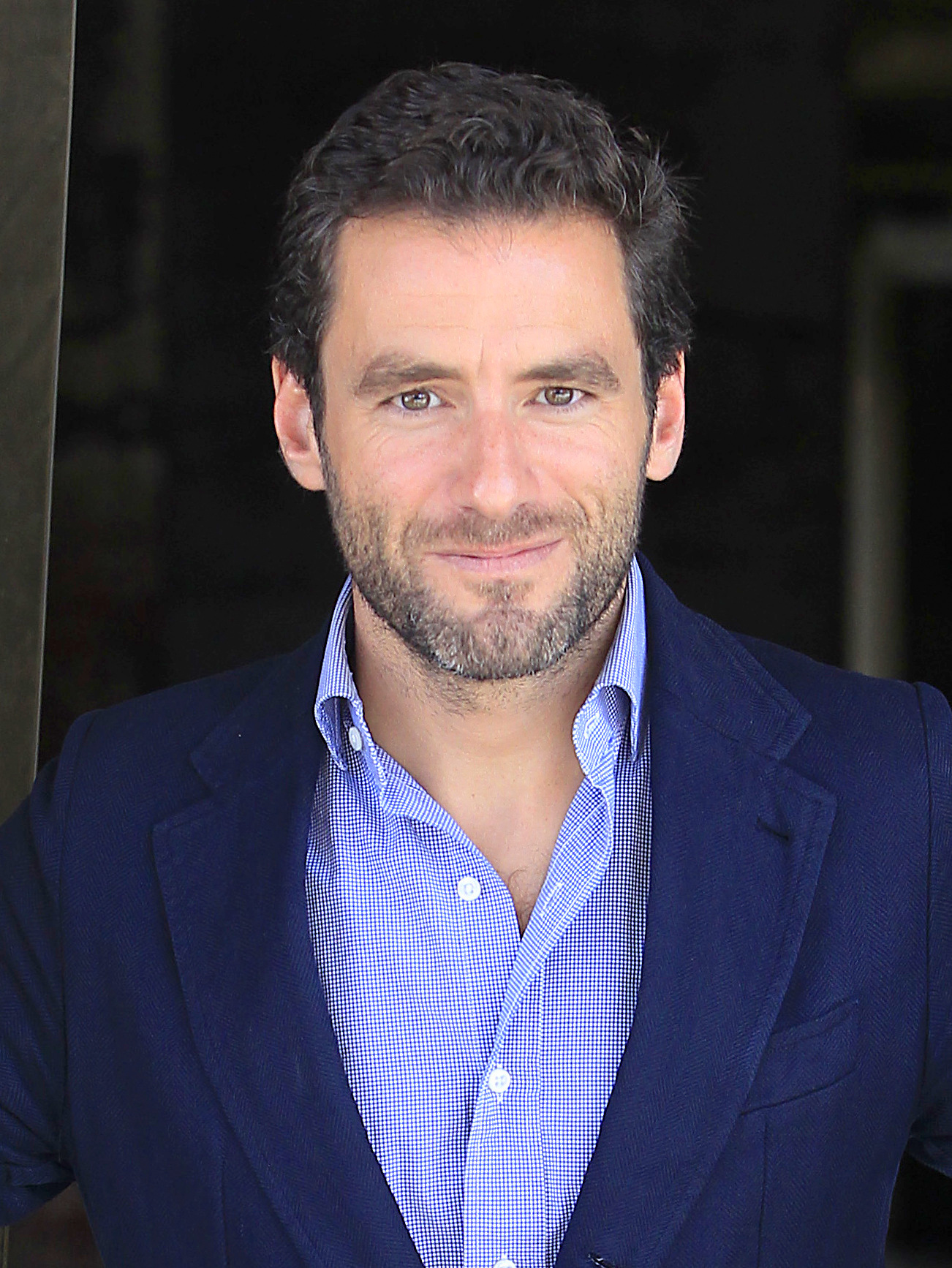
Sémper in 2013

Francisco de Borja Sémper Pascual (born 10 January 1976) is a Spanish People's Party (PP) politician. He was a city councillor in the Basque cities of Irun (1995–2010) and San Sebastián (2019–2020) and a member of the Basque Parliament (2003–2020), serving as party spokesman in the latter chamber from 2013.

A member of the PP from the age of 17 and a target for violence by ETA, he left politics in January 2020 to work for Ernst & Young, but returned three years later to lead the PP's election campaigns and was elected to the Congress of Deputies.

== Biography ==
=== Early life and activism ===
Born in Irun, Gipuzkoa, Basque Country, Sémper joined the People's Party (PP) at the age of 17. He faced at least two assassination attempts from ETA due to his activism, one of which failed in 1997 because he missed his class at the University of the Basque Country, where he was studying for a law degree. In the New Generations of the People's Party, he formed a friendship with Santiago Abascal, who was voted the regional leader of the sector and later became president of Vox.

=== Councillor and member of the Basque Parliament ===
Sémper was voted onto his hometown's council in 1995. He resigned in January 2010, due to conflict with his regional and party political offices. He became a member of the Basque Parliament in November 2003, leader of the provincial PP in November 2009, and the party spokesman in the Basque Parliament in May 2013.

Sémper was selected as the PP candidate for mayor of San Sebastián in December 2018, after 2015 candidate Miren Albistur decided not to run again. The party occupied three of 27 seats in the city council and faced competition on the right from the growth of Citizens and Vox. At the presentation of his campaign in February 2019, he made the unorthodox decision to not use any imagery or colours of his party. After the elections in May, he said that his unusual campaign paid off, as the PP had retained its seats in San Sebastián while experiencing losses elsewhere in the Basque Country.

=== Exit and return to politics ===
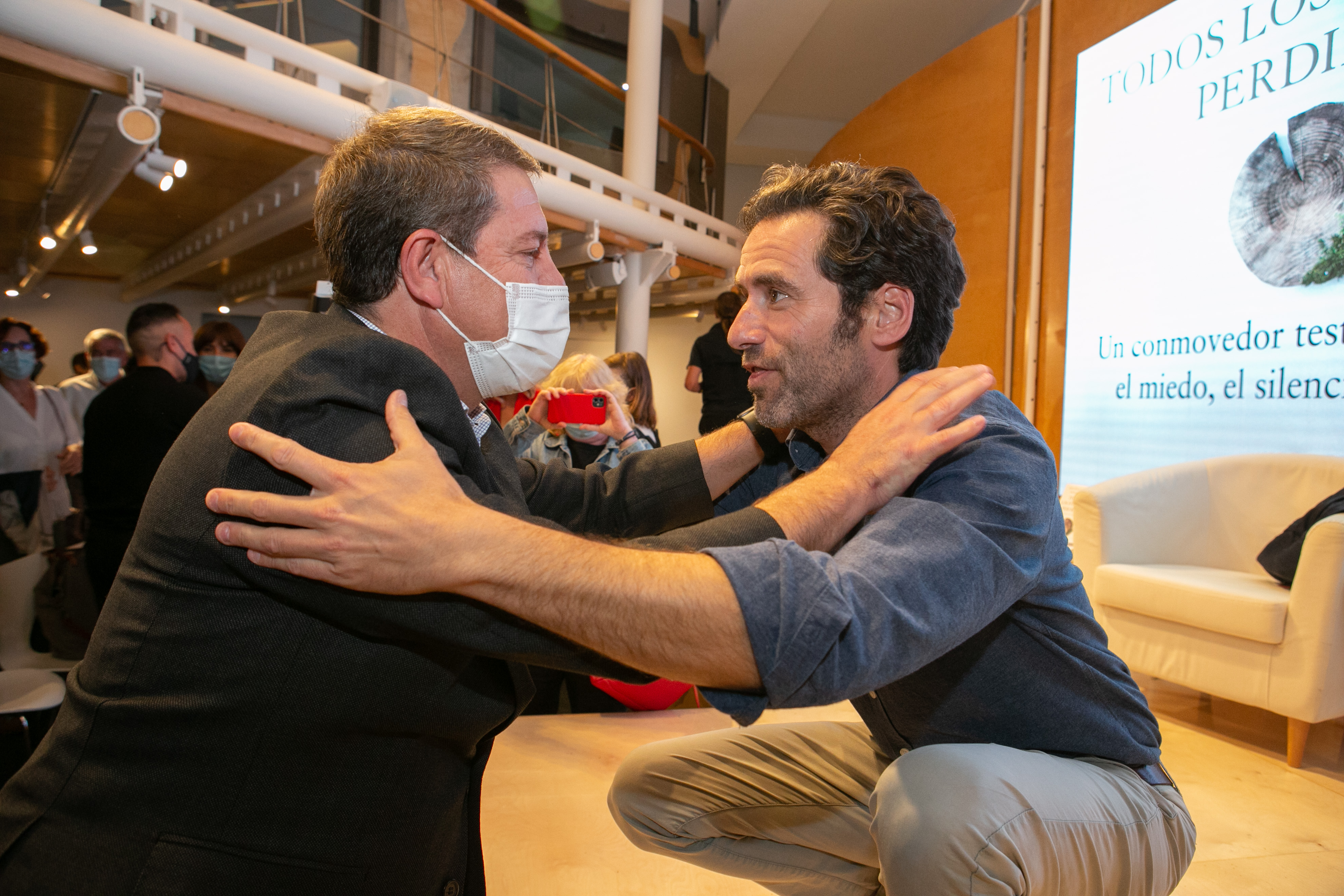
Sémper at the launch of his book in October 2021, with Emiliano García-Page

In January 2020, Sémper left politics for a position as director of institutional relations at Ernst & Young. He said that he could not cope with the confrontational nature of Spanish politics and wanted a new start for his family. In October 2021, he and PSOE politician Eduardo Madina released the book Todos los futuros perdidos ("All the Lost Futures"), marking the tenth anniversary of ETA's ceasefire.

Sémper returned to the PP at the start of 2023, being hired by leader Alberto Núñez Feijóo to lead the campaign for the year's local and regional elections. In the campaign, he expressed discomfort at the unofficial anti-Pedro Sánchez slogan "Let Txapote vote for you" as Txapote, real name Francisco Javier García Gaztelu, was one of the ETA members who had threatened his life. He was elected to the Congress of Deputies as third in the PP list in the Madrid constituency.

== Personal life ==
As of December 2025, Sémper had two sons aged under ten with actress Bárbara Goenaga. Sémper and Goenaga each have one other child from previous relationships.

In July 2025, Sémper announced that he had been diagnosed with cancer.
