= Carlos Goñi =

Spanish musician and singer-songwriter

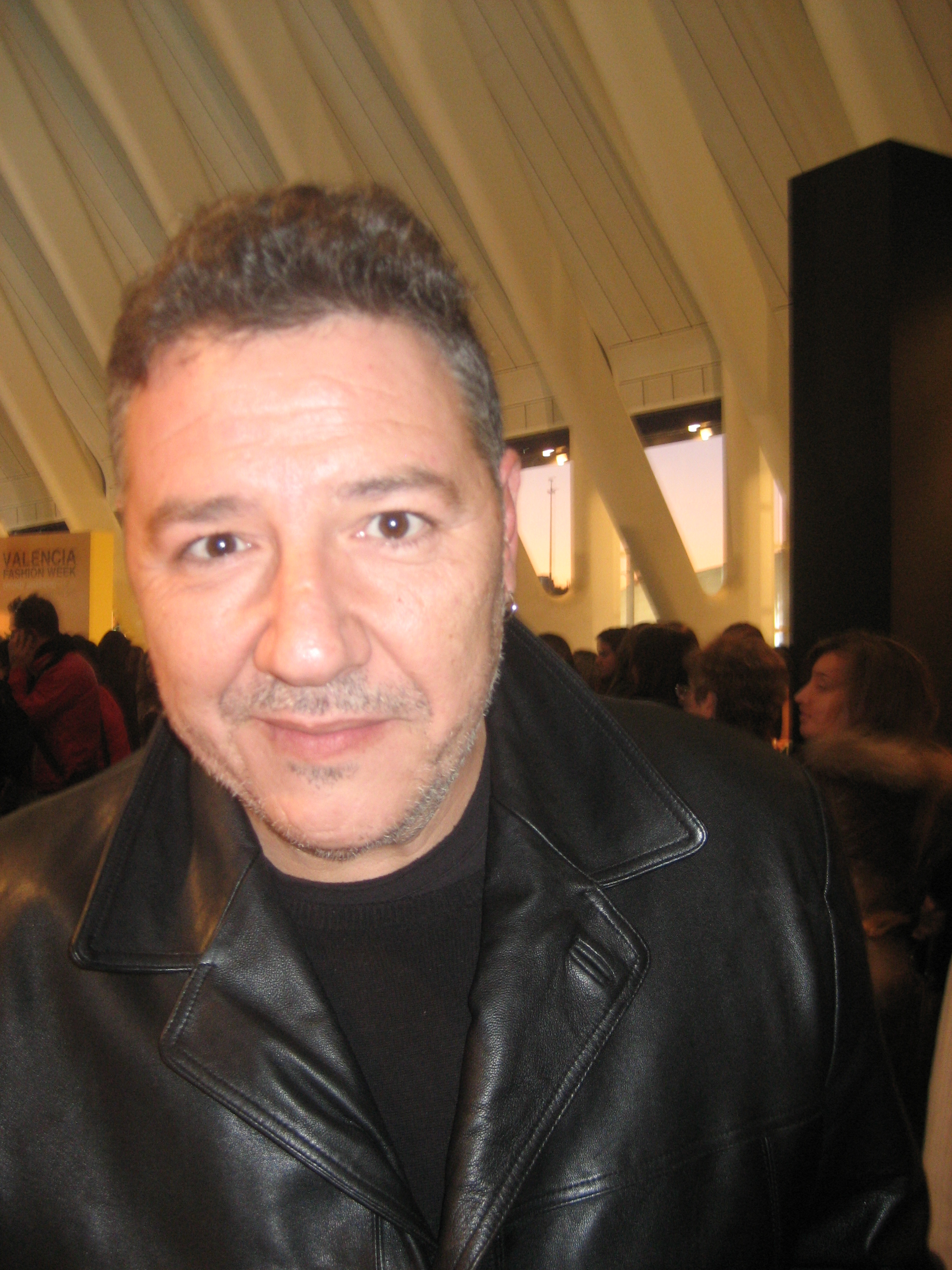

Background information
- Born: Carlos Javier Crespo Goñi; October 8, 1961 (age 64); Las Ventas, Madrid, Spain
- Genres: Rock
- Occupations: Musician and singer-songwriter
- Instruments: Guitar, harmonica
- Years active: 1981–present
- Member of: Comité Cisne, Revólver
- Website: Official website

Carlos Javier Crespo Goñi, better known as Carlos Goñi (born October 8, 1961) is a Spanish musician and singer-songwriter. After creating the rock band Comité Cisne in the 1980s, he started the musical group Revólver in 1988. He achieved greater commercial success at a national level with the acoustic concert Básico, played in the style of 40 Main American MTV Unplugged format. His latest studio album was "Capitol", Released on February 10, 2017. In 2019, he presented "Básico IV", recorded live at Circo Price in Madrid. He was listed as the best Hispanic singer-songwriter of the 21st century at the 2021 MTV Awards.

== Biography ==
=== Childhood and musical beginnings (1961–1981) ===
Carlos Goñi was born in Las Ventas, Madrid in 1961. At the age of six, he left his hometown with his family and moved to the neighborhood of Los Ángeles, Alicante, Madrid. After an injury, he was forced to leave the Agustinos de Alicante handball team, beginning his journey into composition and music.

=== Garage and Comité Cisne (1981–1988) ===
Carlos Goñi joined Garage in 1981, a group formed by Basilio Montes on bass and Manolo "El Tronko" on drums. During the four years of the group's life, they recorded the EP "En movimiento" (Alicante 1982) self-produced by the group with "Matanza de una noche de verano", "Tiempo perdido", "Pelea entre dos frentes", the single "Quiero ser un Bogart" and "La ciudad", released with the independent record label "Dos Rombos".

In 1984, Goñi formed Comité Cisne with former members of Glamour, which included keyboardist José Luis Macías, bassist Remy Carreres and Lino Oviaño. The group debuted in September 1984. The group recorded their first single, "Dulces horas", in 1985, and their first studio album, Comité Cisne, one year later.

A year later, in 1987, the group signed with a local independent label and published El final del mar, which includes one of its most representative songs: "Ana Frank", as well as an EP, Tres canciones de Lou Reed, with versions of the American musician Lou Reed, one of Goñi's main influences. The group's growing interest in the Valencian music scene allowed them to travel to England to record a new album: Beber el viento. However, the differences between Goñi and Macías regarding the group's musical style led Goñi and Picó to leave the group in 1988.

=== Formation and consolidation with Revólver (1989–2006) ===
In January 1989, Goñi founded Revólver together with Rafael Picó, a former member of Comité Cisne, Jorge Lario and Sergio Roger. After recording Revólver (1990) and Si no habera que correr (1992), two albums with a marked influence of American rock, Goñi recorded Básico, the first acoustic concert in Spain in the style of the MTV Unplugged format of the US network, with which he obtained a greater success at the national level when reaching the first position in the list of the 40 Principales with songs like "Inside you" and " If it is only love ".

After the success of Básico, he published El Dorado (1994) and Calle Mayor (1996), two albums with the greatest commercial impact in which Goñi established himself as a nationally successful composer with two types of compositions: some of an autobiographical nature, such as "El Dorado", and others with the denunciation of social inequalities such as racial discrimination in topics such as "Calle Mayor" and "El misma hombre".

In 1997 he published Básico 2, with acoustic versions of songs published on his two previous albums and accompanied by Celtic music instrumentation, as well as unpublished songs such as "Besaré el suelo", which Goñi composed for the singer Luz Casal, and "Una lluvia violenta y salvaje", which narrates the murder of Ermua mayor Miguel Ángel Blanco, who died at the hands of ETA on July 13 of the same year.

Between the release of Básico 2 and his return with Sur in 2000, Goñi founded the record label Nena Records, whose artists include Maldita la Hora, Javier Baeza, Burguitos and Gabriel Abril. Under Nena Records, Goñi published Pyjamarama, a compilation with songs by Valencian groups from the 1980s such as Comité Cisne, Los Auténticos and Última Emoción. In addition, he created the Mojave Studios in La Eliana, Valencia, in the likeness of the Groove Master Studios in Los Angeles, California, where Goñi recorded Calle Mayor.

After publishing a new work in 2002, 8:30 am, and remastering his musical catalog on the occasion of Revólver's 15th anniversary, he produced the album by Los Rebeldes Rebeldes y rebeldes in 2003. In 2004, he published Mestizo, an album with a more rock and power sound and influenced by artists like Lou Reed, Deep Purple and Dick Wagner. The album was nominated for a Latin Grammy and reached number seven on the list of best-selling albums in Spain. In addition, he offered composition classes for new singers together with the singer-songwriter Miquel Gil in a workshop organized by the SGAE, and produced the first album by the group La Lengua de Trapo, recorded in the Mojave studios owned by Goñi.

=== Today (2008–present) ===
In November 2008, Goñi published 21 gramos, a "more reflective and calm" album, according to the musician himself, which included the single "Tiempo pequeño". A year later, he published Que veinte años no es nada, a commemorative compilation box for the twentieth anniversary of Revólver that included four albums – two with the group's greatest hits, a third with rarities and collaborations, and a fourth with a concert – plus two DVDs.

With a particular interest in Moroccan culture, Goñi recorded Argán, Revólver's ninth studio album, in Marrakesh. The album merged the usual sound of Revólver with Arabic instrumentation and reached number six on the list of best-selling albums in Spain.

A few months after finishing the promotional tour for Argán, Goñi formed Comité, a parallel project to Revólver with which he rescued songs from his stage in the group Comité Cisne. The project included the re-recording of songs such as "Ana Frank" and "Licor", published as a digital EP on iTunes, and a concert tour accompanied by Julián Nemesio and Manuel Bagües that began on October 26 in the Sala Repvblicca of Mislata, Valencia.

At the beginning of 2013, he collaborated with Taxi on the song "Cuando veas a Ani", a version of The Band's song "The Weight" published on the album Tras el horizonte, and recorded Enjoy, an electric concert offered at the Joy Eslava room in Madrid on February 21. The publication of Enjoy was originally scheduled for May 28, but a fractured right arm was the result of a fall at a concert in Nambroca, Toledoon on May 11. This forced him to postpone his tour dates and the release of Enjoy, which finally released on August 27.

Parallel to his work as a musician, Goñi participated weekly in the music section of the Hoy por hoy program on Cadena Ser, directed by Marta Novo, during 2014. In 2015, he published Babilonia, an album with a marked sound rock in which he continued with the trio format of Revólver, made up of Bagües and Nemesio. The album reached number two on the list of best-selling albums prepared by Promusicae, second only to Pablo Alborán Terral 's album, and was his best position on the list since the publication of Surin the year 2000.

According to statements by the artist himself, at the end of February or the beginning of March, the release of a new work called Capitol is scheduled, and of which he has revealed that it is a completely acoustic album, where electric guitars will not be present. Also among the songs will include "Angeles de alas sucias" (an unpublished song to date), but which enjoys great popularity and acceptance among the most staunch fans of the band.

In 2019, he began the tour for the 25th anniversary of "Básico (Revólver album)", where he toured the theaters of Spain. In the last concert of the tour, he announced as a surprise the recording of "Básico IV", at the Teatro Circo Price (Madrid), beginning another live tour of the new album.

Once the tour was over, he started another one as a celebration of the 30 years of "Revólver (band)", starting it at the Teatro Nuevo Apolo, in Madrid.

== Discography ==
Garage
| Title | Release year |
|---|---|
| En movimiento | 1982 |
| Matanza de una noche de verano | 1982 |
| Tiempo perdido | 1982 |
| Pelea entre dos frentes | 1982 |
| En Dos Rombos | 1983 |
| Quiero ser un Bogart | 1983 |
| La ciudad | 1983 |

Comité Cisne
| Title | Release year |
|---|---|
| Dulces horas | 1985 |
| Comité Cisne | 1986 |
| Tres canciones de Lou Reed | 1987 |
| El final del mar | 1987 |
| Beber el viento | 1988 |

Revólver
| Album name | Release year |
|---|---|
| Revólver | 1990 |
| Si no hubiera que correr | 1992 |
| Básico | 1993 |
| El Dorado | 1995 |
| Calle Mayor | 1996 |
| Básico 2 | 1997 |
| Sur | 2000 |
| 8:30 am | 2001 |
| Rarezas | 2002 |
| Grandes éxitos | 2003 |
| Mestizo | 2004 |
| Básico 3 | 2006 |
| 21 gramos | 2008 |
| Que veinte años no es nada | 2009 |
| Argan | 2011 |
| Enjoy | 2013 |
| Babilonia | 2015 |
| Capitol | 2017 |
| Básico IV | 2019 |
