= Patrick Nogueira =

Brazilian murderer (born 1996)

- Born: 6 November 1996 (age 29); Altamira, Brazil
- Convictions: 4 counts of murder
- Penalty: Three life sentences plus 25 years (2018)

Details
- Date apprehended: 19 October 2016
- Imprisoned at: Puerto III prison, El Puerto de Santa María (2021–), Estremera Prison (2016–2021)

François Patrick Nogueira Gouveia (born 6 November 1996) is a Brazilian murderer serving three life sentences plus 25 years in Spain for the murders of his aunt, uncle, and two infant cousins in Pioz, Castilla–La Mancha on 17 August 2016.

Nogueira grew up in a wealthy family. In 2013, he wounded his teacher in a stabbing, and served time in youth detention and psychiatric care. He then moved to Europe with the aim of becoming a professional footballer, and lived with his uncle's family from March 2016. Tensions grew over his laziness and inappropriate behaviour, and the family moved to a new address without him in July.

He murdered the family in August 2016, sending live updates to his friend Marvin Henriques Correia in Brazil. Nogueira returned to Brazil but became subject of an arrest warrant when his DNA was found at the crime scene. He returned to Spain in October to avoid a trial in Brazil, and was found guilty in November 2018. Henriques Correia was charged in Brazil as an alleged accomplice, and acquitted in July 2021.

== Background ==
Patrick Nogueira's four victims. From left to right: María Carolina (3), Marcos Campos (40), Janaína Santos (39) and Davi (1)

Nogueira was born in Altamira, Pará, to a wealthy radiologist father. From the age of 10, he was bullied by older children, reacting first with violence and then by drinking alcohol. By 15 he was drinking a bottle a day, and at the age of 18 he was vomiting blood from an ulcer. In 2013, he stabbed his teacher non-fatally in front of his class "because he called me a faggot" and served 45 days in youth detention, and six months of psychiatric treatment.

At the end of his treatment, Nogueira moved to Europe in the dream of becoming a professional footballer, while living off his father's money. Nogueira played for a season in England, which derailed due to alcohol problems. From March 2016, he lived in Torrejón de Ardoz with his uncle Marcos Campos (age 40) and his uncle's wife Janaína Santos (39), alongside their daughter María Carolina (3) and son Davi (1). On 9 July they moved to Pioz, and he moved to Alcalá de Henares without maintaining contact.

Nogueira spent most of his time alone in his room, and only ever showed signs of co-operation when helping the family move house. Once when seeing his cousin cry, he inquired whether they could be taken to the town square to freeze to death or be kidnapped. His uncle chided him for walking around the house in his underwear, and pledged to report Nogueira to the police for deportation when his three-month visa expired.

== Murders ==
Nogueira researched "How to kill someone in three seconds" before taking the bus to Pioz, arriving at 2:00 pm with two pizzas for the family to eat. After the meal, he went to the kitchen and stabbed Santos to death, and then killed the children. He communicated on WhatsApp with a friend from Brazil, boasting of his crimes, and sending selfies of the corpses. When Campos returned home at 10:15 pm, Nogueira told him to "look around you...you're next" before stabbing him to death as well. Unable to find soft ground for his planned burial of the corpses, he dismembered them and put them in bin bags. He slept in the house so that he would not be spotted by the security guard.

== Investigation ==
The corpses were not found for a month until 17 September, when neighbours were alerted by the smell. Investigators at first believed that the murders were related to drug gangs, as the family had barely furnished the new house or met their neighbours, as if they were hiding. Nogueira denied involvement, saying that the family moved to Pioz without telling him the address.

Nogueira flew back to his hometown of João Pessoa, Paraíba on 20 September. A razor left in his home in Alcalá provided his DNA to Spanish investigators, which was also found in the property in Pioz. On 22 September, a European and international arrest warrant was issued for his arrest. Brazilian authorities did not arrest him, due to the nation's constitutional prohibition of extradition. Nogueira voluntarily handed himself in to Spanish authorities on 19 October. His sister, a lawyer, had earlier been to Spain to meet the presiding judge, and convinced Nogueira that it would be better to be jailed in Spain than Brazil; he was immediately put in pre-trial detention. Nogueira feared the prospect of prison rape in Brazil, but believed that he would spend his life watching television in a Spanish prison. He confessed within days of returning to Spain.

== Legal process ==
=== Nogueira ===
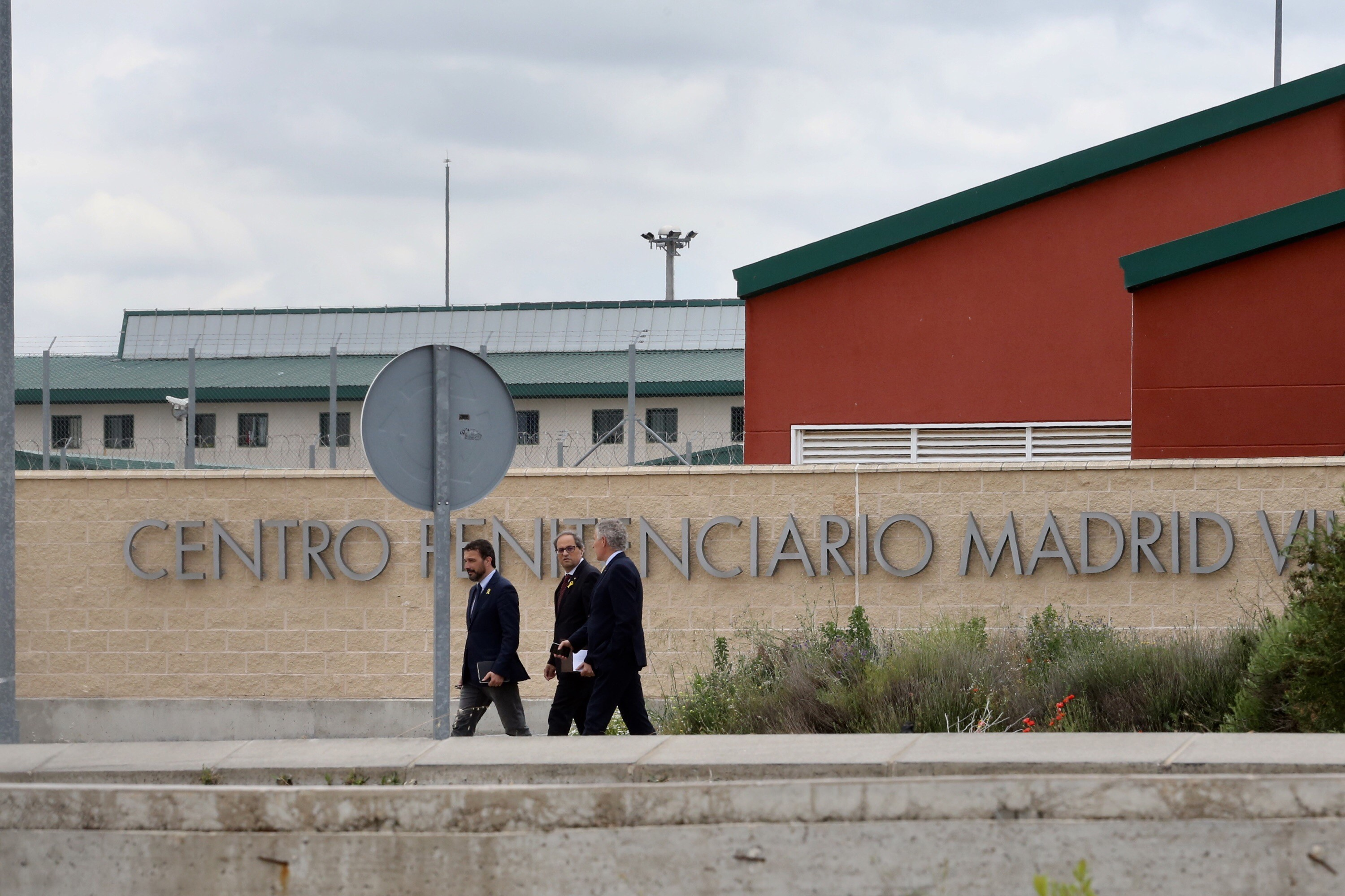
Nogueira was held at Estremera Prison until 2021

Nogueira was tried in Guadalajara from October to November 2018, over video link from Estremera Prison. His defence argued that he had a deficient right temporal lobe in his brain, affecting his decision making, and that this had been aggravated by alcoholism.

Nogueira was found unanimously guilty by the jury and sentenced to three life sentences for the murders of Campos and the children, plus a further 25 years for the murder of Santos. He became the fifth person to be given a life sentence in Spain since the penalty was reinstated in 2015. The aggravating factors of the three murders over the other were the ages of the children, and the premeditation of the murder of Campos hours after the others. In June 2019 this sentence was partially upheld on appeal by the Castile–La Mancha Supreme Court, who revised it as a single life sentence for the murder of Campos plus 75 years for the other three, due to a technicality in applying aggravating factors. The original sentence was reinstated by the Supreme Court of Spain in May 2020, and also ordered Nogueira to pay €411,915 to relatives of the victims.

=== Acquittal of suspected accomplice ===
The friend with whom Nogueira communicated on the day of the murder, Marvin Henriques Correia, was charged in the Brazilian state of Paraíba with being an accomplice. He was held in pre-trial detention from June 2019 to May 2020. In July 2021 he was acquitted when it was ruled that none of his actions were criminal.

=== Life in prison ===
Nogueira was detained in the solitary isolation wing of Estremera prison, under a 24-hour guard. As of the anniversary of his conviction, he had not repented for his crimes.

Nogueira was attacked at the end of November 2021 by approximately a dozen inmates, remaining in hospital for four days. Officials speculated that the reason was the "jail law", in which those who commit serious crimes against children and women are executed by the prison population. After recovering, he was transferred to prison Puerto III in El Puerto de Santa María, Province of Cádiz under preventive isolation.

== In popular culture ==
Journalist Beatriz Osa wrote the 2020 non-fiction book Olor a Muerte en Pioz ("Smell of Death in Pioz") about the murders.

In October 2021, Atresplayer Premium announced a five-part documentary series on the case. The series centres on the question of whether or not Marvin Henriques Correia was an accomplice by reading Nogueira's WhatsApp messages in Brazil. A year later, it was released under the title No se lo digas a nadie (Don't Tell Anyone).

== See also ==
- List of people sentenced to more than one life imprisonment
