= María del Mar Blanco =

Spanish politician (born 1974)

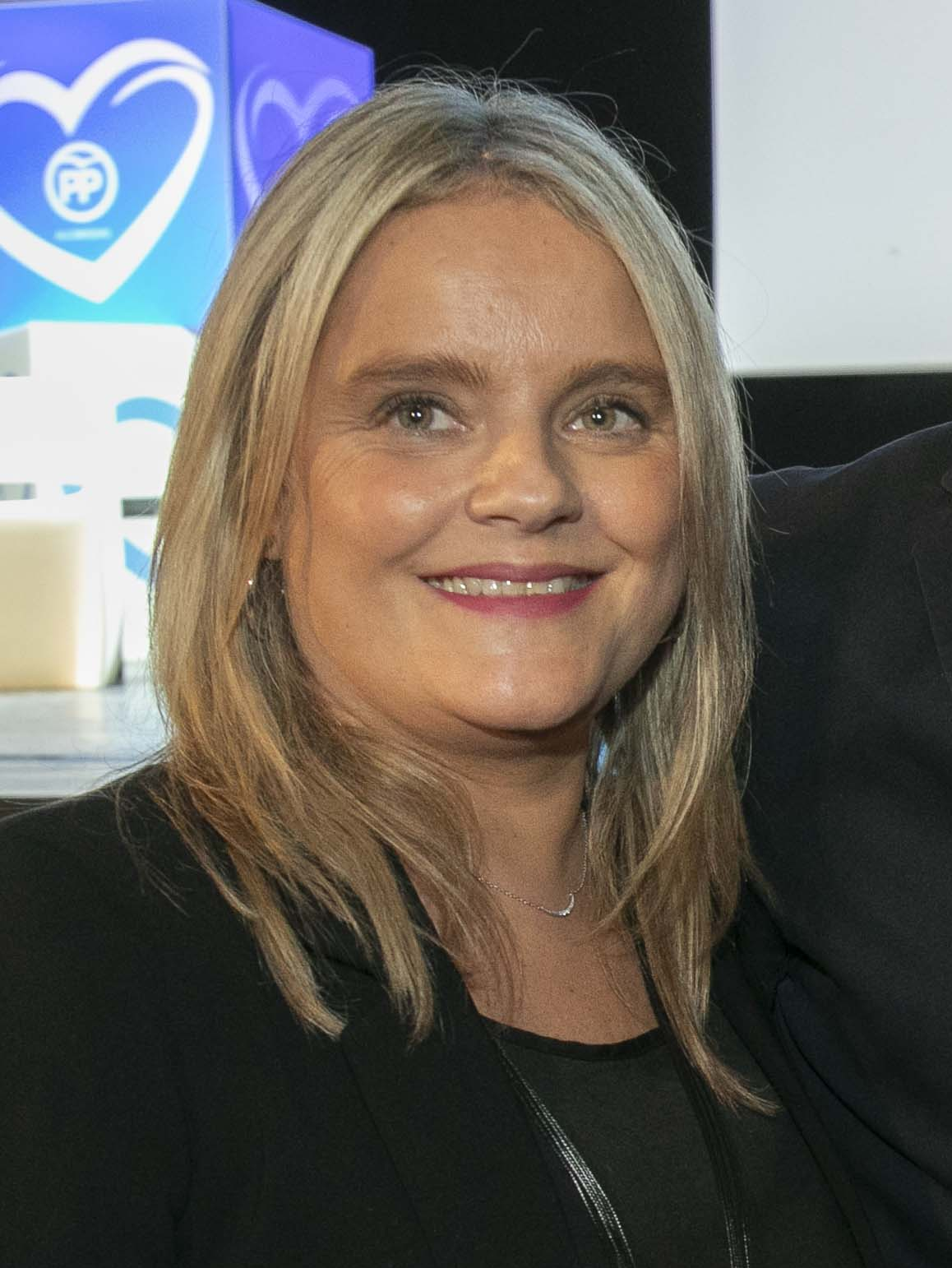
Blanco in 2018

María del Mar Blanco Garrido (born 29 March 1974) is a Spanish People's Party (PP) politician. She has served as a member of the Basque Parliament (2009–2012), Congress of Deputies (2016–2019) and Assembly of Madrid (since 2021).

== Biography ==
Born in Ermua, Biscay, Blanco was the younger sister of People's Party councillor Miguel Ángel Blanco, who was kidnapped and murdered by ETA at the age of 29 in 1997. Their parents Consuelo and Miguel, who migrated from the Province of Ourense in Galicia, both died in March 2020; their former died of COVID-19.

Blanco had finished studying tourism shortly before the assassination of her brother. She was elected to the Basque Parliament in the 2009 Basque regional election, 6th in the PP's list in Álava. In the 2012 election, the party fell to five seats in that constituency but still wanted her presence in parliament at the expense of someone further up the list; she relinquished any claim of a seat.

In October 2012, Blanco became president of the Victims of Terrorism Foundation (FVT). She was the 14th of 15 PP members elected by Madrid to the Congress of Deputies in the 2016 Spanish general election. In the April 2019 election, the party fell to seven seats in the capital constituency, but Daniel Lacalle and Andrea Levy renounced their seats to let Blanco and Juan Ignacio Echániz take office.

In the November 2019 Spanish general election, Blanco led the PP in the Álava constituency. With just under 15%, the party elected no members in the constituency for the second consecutive time. She worked as a consultant on housing for the City Council of Madrid until being elected to the Assembly of Madrid in the 2021 regional election.

Around the 2023 Spanish general election, Blanco endorsed the slogan "Let Txapote vote for you" against the prime minister of Spain, Pedro Sánchez. "Txapote" was the nickname of Francisco Javier García Gaztelu, one of the murderers of her brother.
