= Beatriz Jurado =

Spanish politician

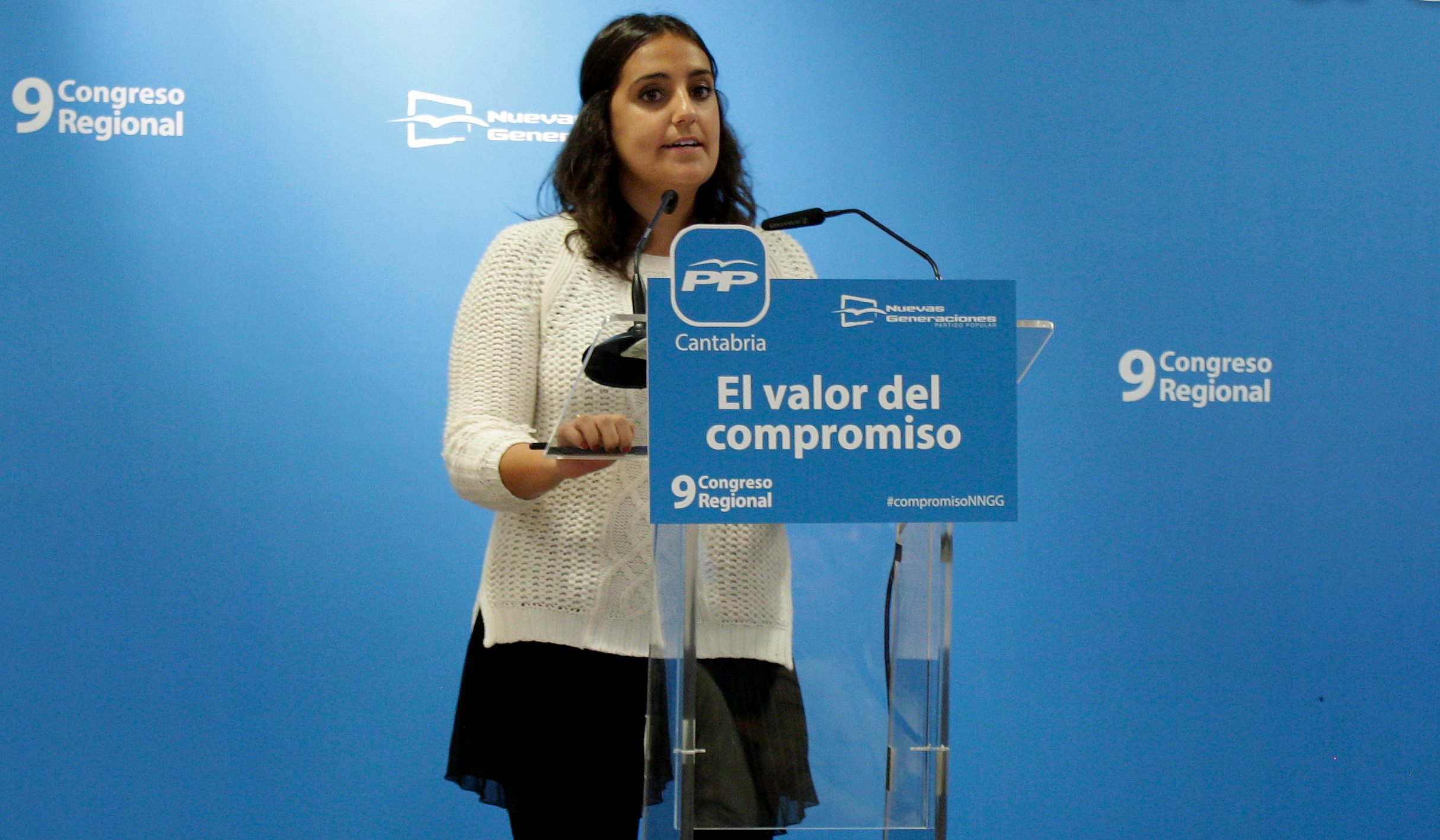

María Beatriz Jurado Fernández de Córdoba (born 3 March 1983) is a Spanish People's Party (PP) politician. She was the president of the New Generations of the People's Party (NNGG) from 2011 to 2017 and a member of the Senate of Spain from 2011 to 2018, when she was elected to the Parliament of Andalusia.

== Political career ==
Born in Córdoba in Andalusia, Jurado obtained a law degree from the University of Córdoba. She was president of the New Generations of the People's Party (NNGG) in her city from 2007 to 2009 and region from 2009 to 2011, before being voted its national president. She was elected to the Senate of Spain in the 2011 Spanish general election by the Córdoba constituency, as the most voted candidate. Four years later, she was the only one of three People's Party (PP) incumbents for the constituency to retain their seat. She was again the most voted in 2016, when her party's seats from the constituency returned to three.

In 2017, Jurado was unable to run again as president of NNGG having passed its maximum age of 30, and the office went to Diego Gago, who had run unopposed. She was second on the PP list for the Córdoba constituency of the Parliament of Andalusia in the 2018 regional election, of which three were elected. She was fourth on the list for the 2022 election, in which her party took seven seats in the constituency, its first victory over the Spanish Socialist Workers' Party (PSOE).

== Personal life ==
Jurado has three children. The second, born in 2014, was diagnosed with coarctation of the aorta, a congenital heart defect, after suffering multiple organ failure at nine months old. The third was born in a car and delivered by his father in 2017.
