= Dancausa =

Dancausa is a Spanish surname. Notable people with the surname include:

- Concepción Dancausa (born 1952), Spanish politician
- Ignacio Dancausa (born 2001), Spanish politician
- María Dolores Dancausa (born 1959), Spanish executive
