= Beatriz Fanjul =

Spanish politician

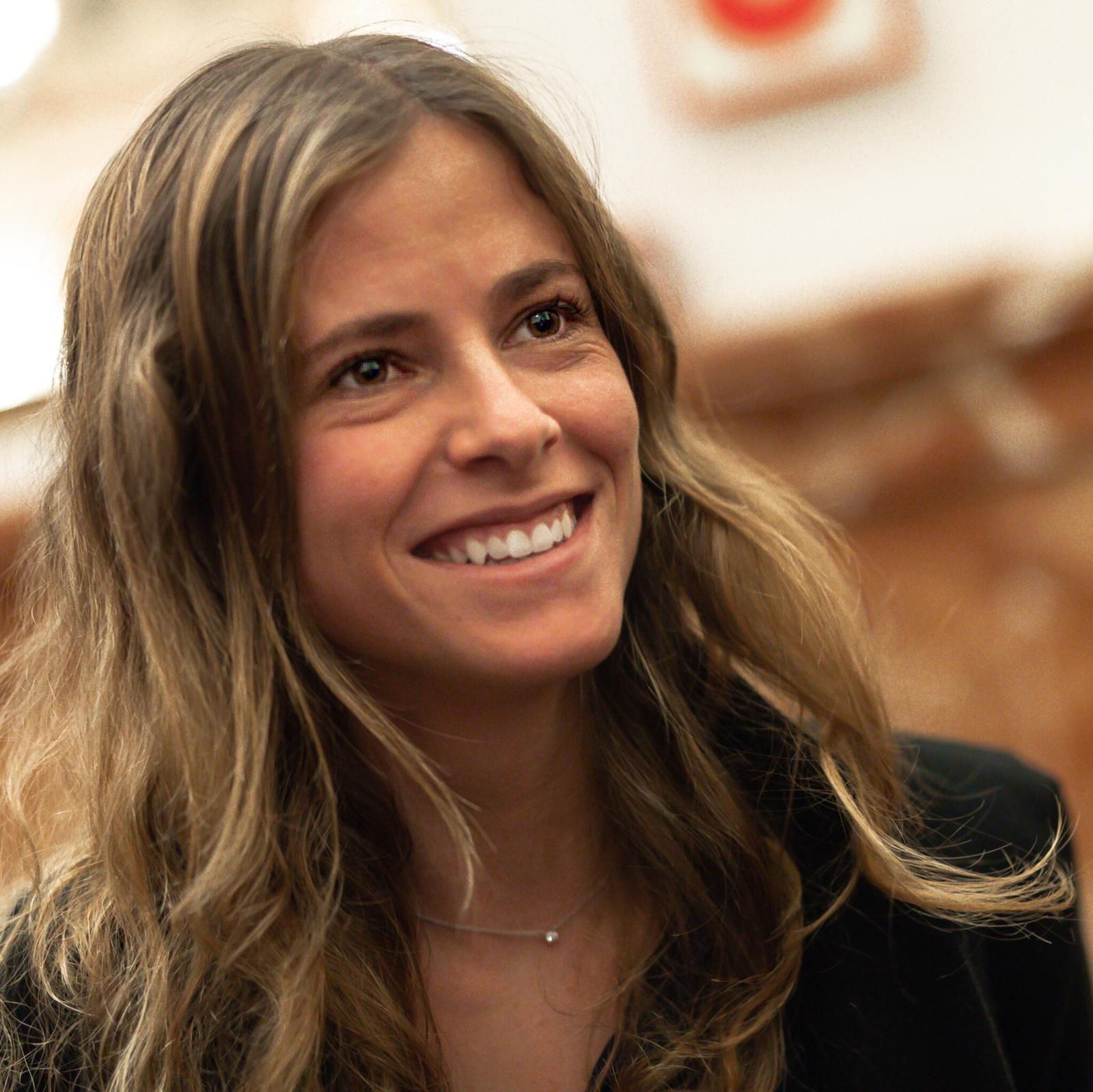

Beatriz Isabel Álvarez Fanjul (born 23 August 1991) is a Spanish People's Party (PP) politician. She was elected to the Congress of Deputies to represent Biscay in November 2019. She was president of the New Generations of the People's Party (NNGG) from 2021 to 2026.

== Biography ==
Fanjul was born in Bilbao in the Basque Country as one of six children, including a twin sister. She studied Business Administration and Management from the University of Deusto; as of November 2019 she had not graduated. She began playing chess at the age of four and played it competitively until she was 25.

Having been a candidate in the April 2019 Spanish general election, 28-year-old Fanjul was elected by the Biscay constituency in the November election, after the addition of gave the People's Party (PP) a seat at the expense of the Basque Nationalist Party (EAJ-PNV). She was her party's only deputy elected in the Basque Country. Endorsed by PP leader Pablo Casado, she was elected president of the New Generations of the People's Party (NNGG) in April 2021, with 96% of the vote. She was succeeded five years later by Ignacio Dancausa.

Fanjul named as her political heroes two Basque members of the PP, Gregorio Ordóñez (assassinated by ETA in 1995) and Antón Damborenea. She has publicly stated that she has a "magnificent relationship" with Vox leader Santiago Abascal as a fellow Basque and former NNGG activist, despite holding opposing opinions on gender violence, autonomous communities and the European Union. Fanjul has described herself as economically liberal and socially conservative.
