= Pontedeva =

- Municipality
- Coat of arms

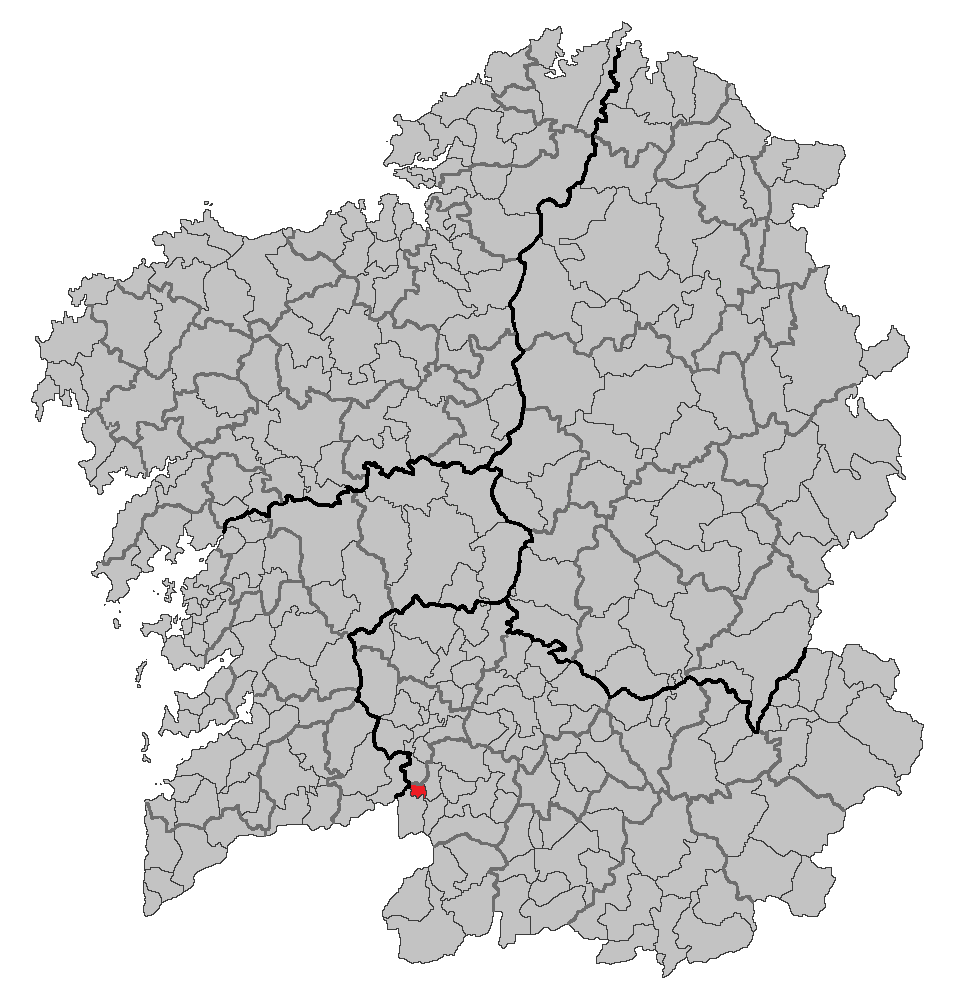
- Location in Galicia

- Location in Spain
- Coordinates: 42°10′07″N 8°08′21″W
- Country: Spain
- Autonomous community: Galicia
- Province: Ourense
- Comarca: Terra de Celanova

Government
  - Mayor: Juan Carlos González Carbajales (People's Party)

Area
  - Total: 9.9 km^{2} (3.8 sq mi)
- Elevation: 148 m (486 ft)

Population (2025-01-01)
  - Total: 458
  - Density: 46/km^{2} (120/sq mi)
- Time zone: UTC+1 (CET)
  - Summer (DST): UTC+2 (CEST)
- Website: www.pontedeva.es/

Pontedeva is a small municipality in Ourense in the Galicia region of north-west Spain. It belongs to the comarca of Terra de Celanova. It is located to the very west of the province.
