= Padrenda =

- Municipality
- Flag Coat of arms

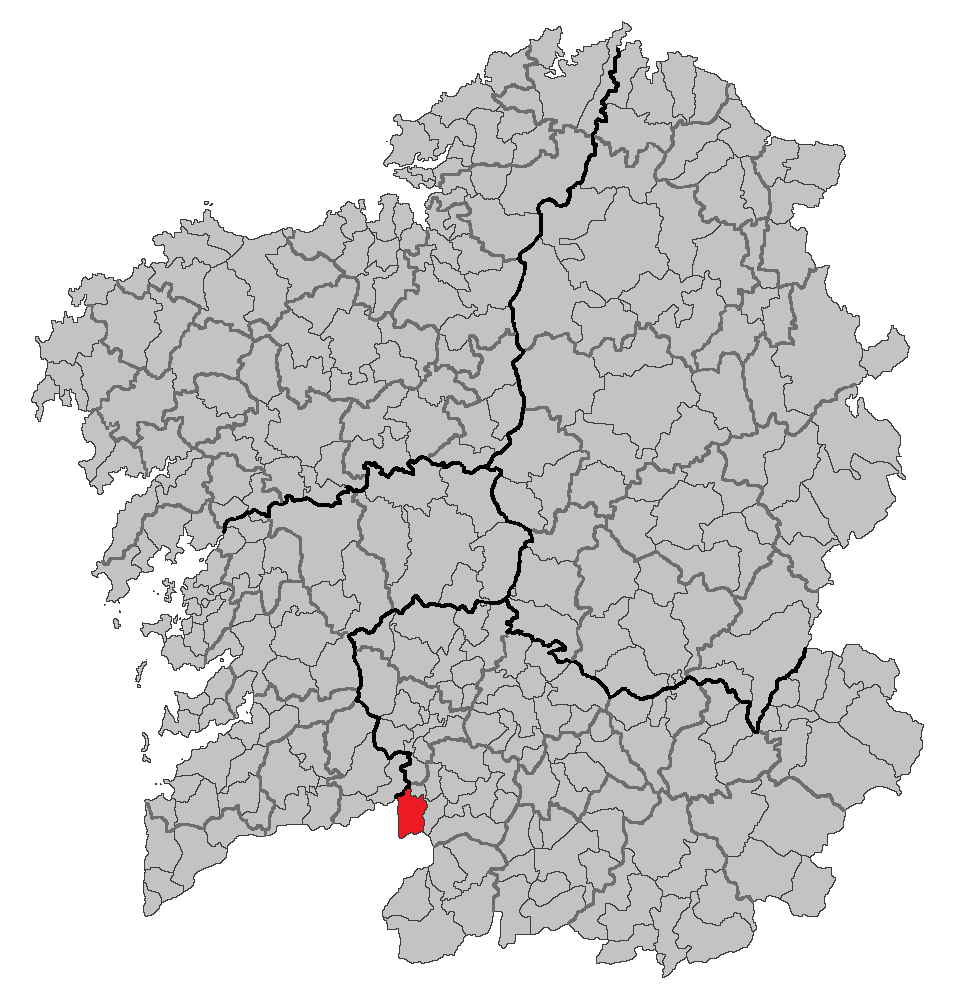
- Location in Galicia

- Location in Spain
- Coordinates: 42°08′22″N 08°09′30″W
- Country: Spain
- Autonomous community: Galicia
- Province: Ourense
- Comarca: Terra de Celanova

Government
  - Mayor: Manuel Pérez Pereira (PP)

Area
  - Total: 57.0 km^{2} (22.0 sq mi)
- Elevation: 339 m (1,112 ft)

Population (2025-01-01)
  - Total: 1,555
  - Density: 27.3/km^{2} (70.7/sq mi)
- Time zone: UTC+1 (CET)
  - Summer (DST): UTC+2 (CEST)
- Website: Official website

Padrenda is a municipality in the province of Ourense, in the autonomous community of Galicia, Spain. It belongs to the comarca of Terra de Celanova. As of 2016, the municipality has a population of 1,893; distributed in 99 different hamlets, and 7 parishes; the density is 33 inhabitants/km^{2}.

== Geography ==
The territory is a very rugged relief, descending in elevation from the south to the north. Pena Rubia mountain, in the Leboreiro mountain range along the border with Portugal, reaches 1227 metres. From there to the river Miño, following the valleys of its tributary rivers Deva, Barxas, and Gorgua, the lands descend to 100 metres elevation.

The landscape is generally mountainous in the south, with river valleys in the north along Miño and its tributaries. The mountainous territory include the southern and eastern areas of the municipality, with elevations of 1227 metres, as in Pena Rubia, that has a very smooth topography, very affected by erosion. The flattening territory, in the center and east, (where the villages of Gorgua, Monterredondo, and Padrenda are located), is a parallel step next to the previous one. Here several streams meet and create the origin of two rivers, Barxas and Gorgua, which form valleys under the limit of 600 metres, which belong to the lower flattening territory (Crespos), that, together with the area of valleys (Condado, Desteriz, Padrenda), descends to 200m in Pontebarxas.

== See also ==
- Official webpage of the Municipality
- Terras de Celanova
- Non official forum of the Municipality of Padrenda
