= Terra de Celanova =

Coordinates: 42°10′43″N 8°02′08″W

- Comarca
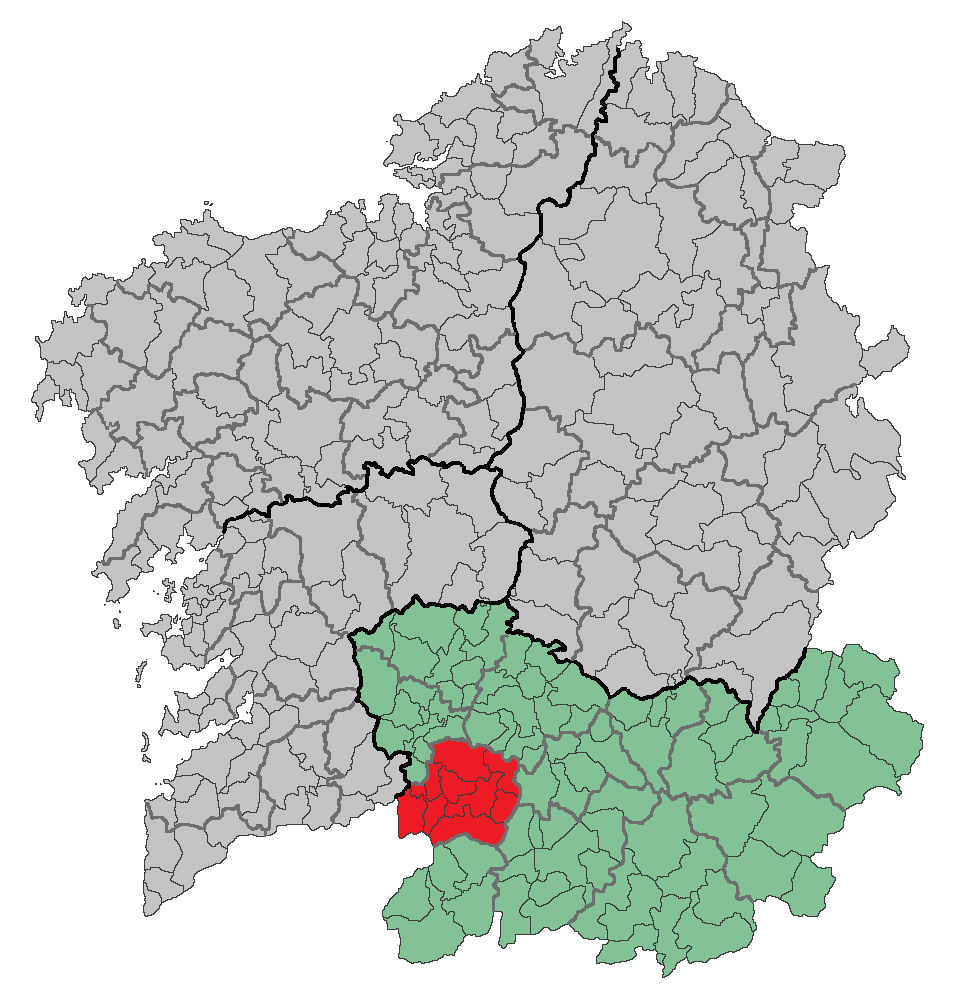
- Country: Spain
- Autonomous community: Galicia
- Province: Ourense
- Capital: Celanova
- Municipalities: List: A Bola, Cartelle, Celanova, Gomesende, A Merca, Padrenda, Pontedeva, Quintela de Leirado, Ramirás, Verea

Area
  - Total: 508.86 km^{2} (196.47 sq mi)

Population (2019)
  - Total: 17,497
  - Density: 34.385/km^{2} (89.056/sq mi)
- Time zone: UTC+1 (CET)
  - Summer (DST): UTC+2 (CEST)

Terra de Celanova is a comarca in the Galician province of Ourense. The overall population of this local region is 17,497 (2019).

== Municipalities ==
A Bola, Cartelle, Celanova, Gomesende, A Merca, Padrenda, Pontedeva, Quintela de Leirado, Ramirás and Verea.
