= Castle of Pioz =

Cultural property in Pioz, Spain

- Castillo de Pioz (Spanish)
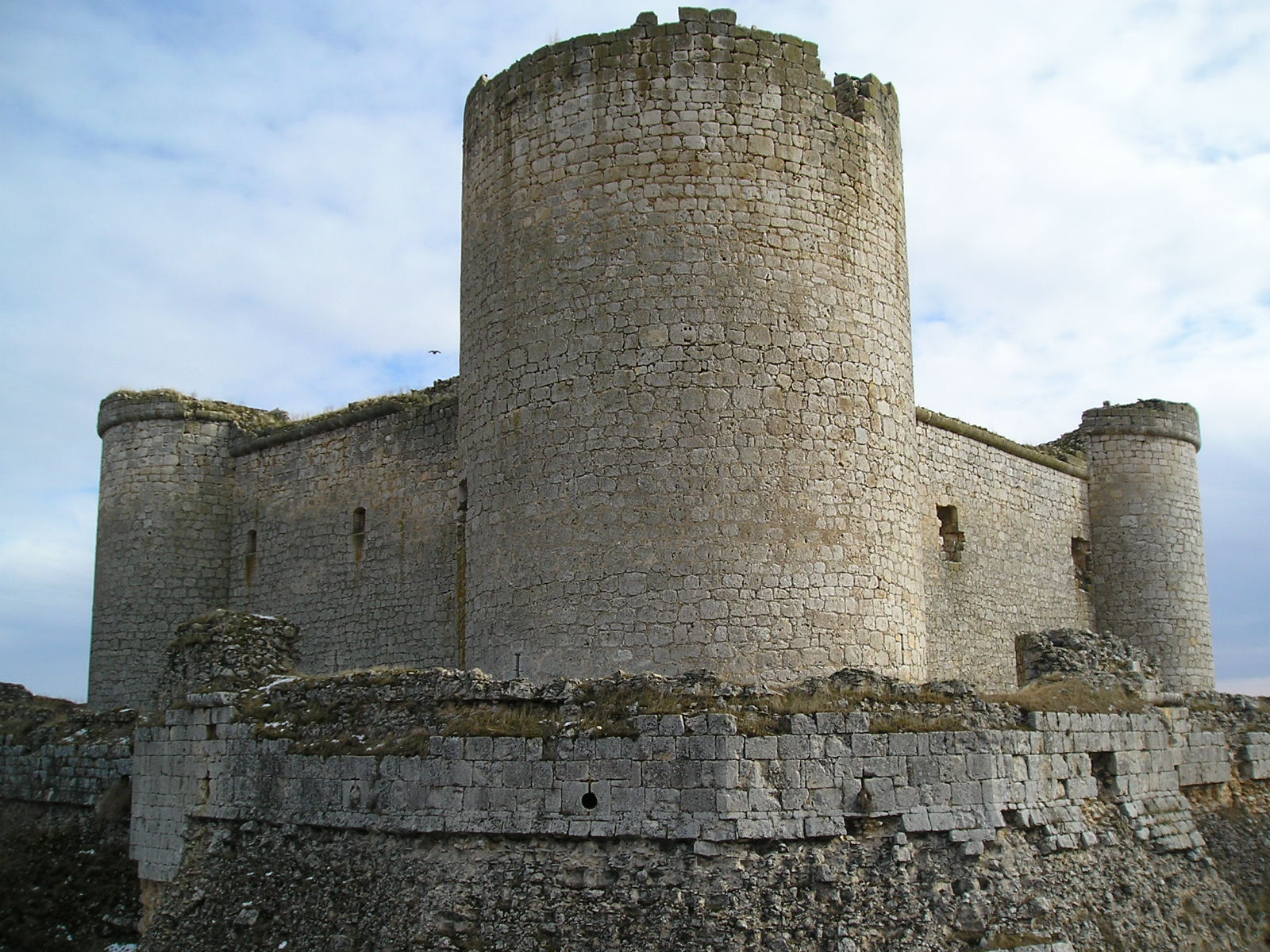

- Location within Spain
- 40.464722°N 3.171389°W
- Location: Pioz, Spain

Spanish Cultural Heritage
- Official name: Castillo de Pioz
- Type: Non-movable
- Criteria: Monument
- Designated: 1990
- Reference no.: RI-51-0006820

The Castle of Pioz (Spanish: Castillo de Pioz) is a castle located in Pioz, Spain. It was declared Bien de Interés Cultural in 1990.
