= Gomesende =

- Municipality
- Flag Coat of arms

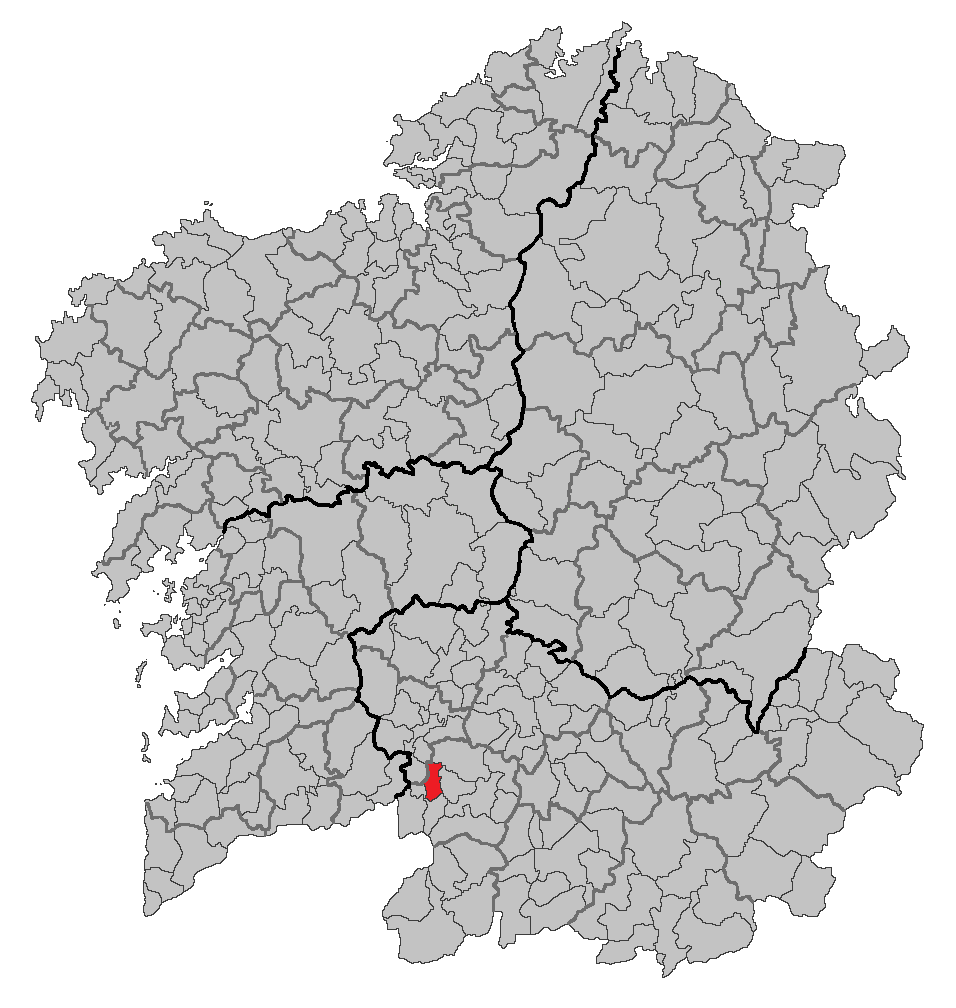
- Location in Galicia

- Location in Spain
- Coordinates: 42°11′16″N 8°05′57″W
- Country: Spain
- Autonomous community: Galicia
- Province: Ourense
- Comarca: Terra de Celanova

Government
  - Mayor: Pura Rodríguez Álvarez

Area
  - Total: 28.3 km^{2} (10.9 sq mi)
- Elevation: 445 m (1,460 ft)

Population (2025-01-01)
  - Total: 646
  - Density: 22.8/km^{2} (59.1/sq mi)
- Time zone: UTC+1 (CET)
  - Summer (DST): UTC+2 (CEST)
- INE municipality code: 32033

Gomesende is a municipality in the province of Ourense, in the autonomous community of Galicia, Spain. It belongs to the comarca of Terra de Celanova.
