= Ignacio Dancausa =

Spanish politician

Ignacio Dancausa García (born 2001) is a Spanish politician. He was named president of the New Generations of the People's Party (NNGG) in the Community of Madrid in 2022, and the national president of the organisation in 2026. In 2023, he was elected to the council in Las Rozas de Madrid.

== Biography ==
Dancausa was born in Las Rozas de Madrid in 2001. At age 18, he joined the People's Party (PP) and in 2021 he founded the student group Libertad sin Ira (Freedom without Wrath). He worked as an assistant at Ikea and Leroy Merlin before setting up an online store selling electric scooters. In 2022, while a student of public management and administration at the Complutense University of Madrid, he was appointed president of the New Generations of the People's Party (NNGG) in the Community of Madrid, by Isabel Díaz Ayuso, president of the Community of Madrid and of the People's Party of the Community of Madrid. This was the first change in the leadership of the regional youth branch in nine years, due to tumult in the leadership of the senior party.

In the 2023 Spanish local elections, Dancausa was named 11th on the PP list in Las Rozas. The party won an absolute majority of 18 out of 25 seats.

On 4 June 2026, Dancausa achieved the sufficient support to be elected president of the NNGG. This came by merging his candidacy with that of Antonio Landáburu, leader in the Region of Murcia, in which the latter would be vice president. With 96.5% of the votes, he was elected on 11 July at the congress in Valladolid, succeeding Beatriz Fanjul.

== Political positions ==
Dancausa is a self-described follower of Ayuso. On his election in 2026, he declared "wokeism is officially dead". He has criticised attitudes he ascribes to baby boomer voters of his party, that his generation are unable to buy property because they spend too much on subscription services. He said that young people's access to property should be aided by a strong economy, rather than regulating rent.

Dancausa criticised the government of Pedro Sánchez over the 2026 Ceuta migrant crisis and alleged that they had prior intelligence. He said in 2022 that he supported renewable energy and sustainable policy, and that climate change was a real issue, though less important that mental health, security or the economy.
