= Gregorio Ordóñez =

Assassinated Spanish politician

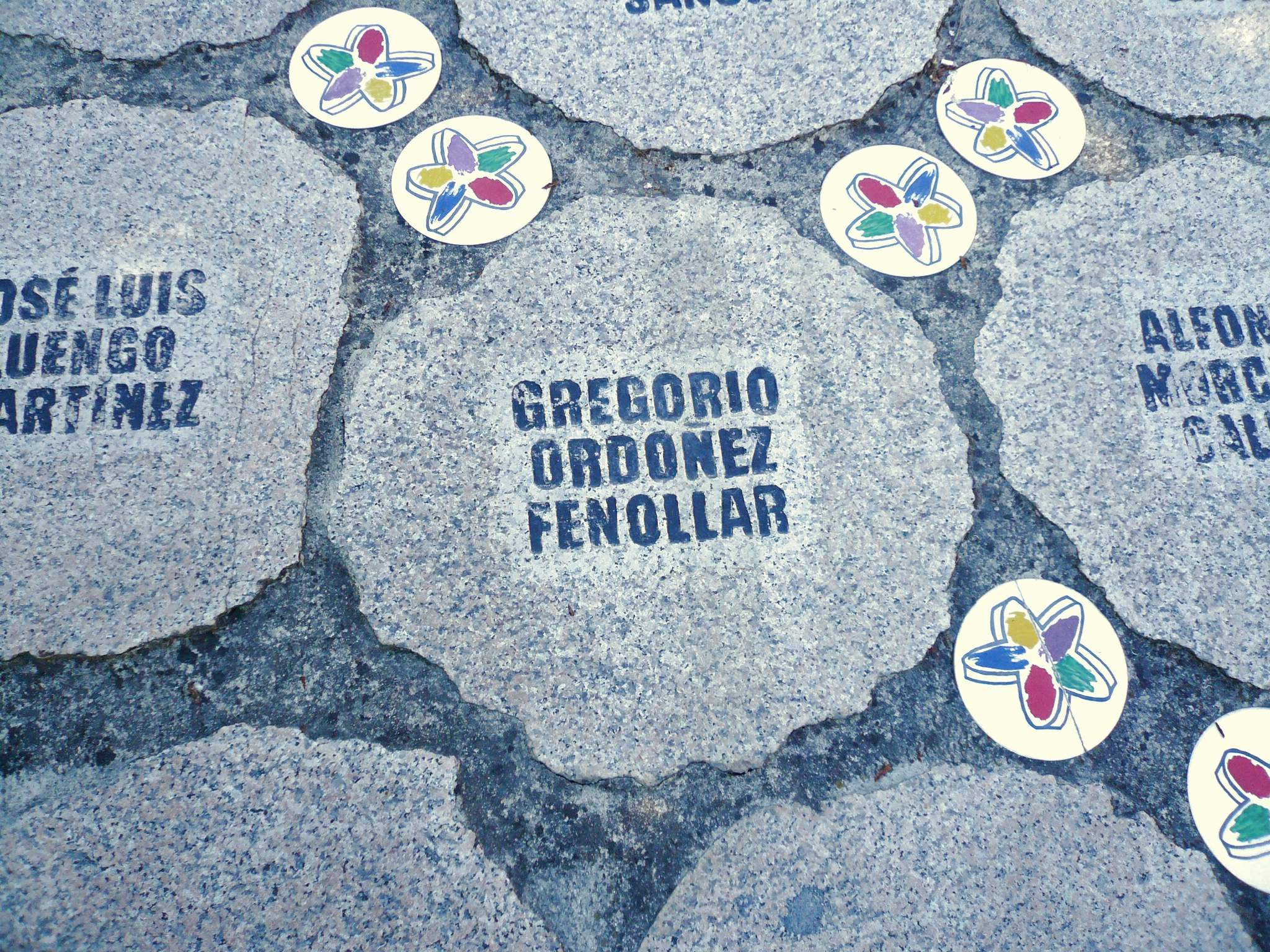
Ordóñez's name on a monument to those killed by ETA, in Vitoria-Gasteiz

Gregorio Ordóñez Fenollar (21 July 1958 – 23 January 1995) was a Spanish People's Party (PP) politician in the Basque Country. He was elected to the City Council in San Sebastián in 1983 and the Basque Parliament in 1990. He became deputy mayor of the city in 1991 and was running for mayor in the 1995 election when he was assassinated by ETA.

== Biography ==
Ordóñez was born in Caracas, Venezuela, to Spanish parents who had emigrated in the late 1940s. His paternal grandfather was killed by communists in 1936 during the Spanish Civil War, and his parents met when his 13-year-old orphan father was moved from Teruel to Terrateig in the Province of Valencia. When he was six, his family moved back to Spain, first to Valencia and then settling in San Sebastián in the Basque Country.

Ordóñez was admitted into Opus Dei during his baccalaureate. After graduating in journalism from the University of Navarra, he began writing for Norte Exprés, a centre-right newspaper in San Sebastián, and received threats from ETA. After his friend's father was murdered by the group in 1982, he joined the People's Alliance (AP) and its New Generations (NNGG) youth sector.

In the 1983 Spanish local elections, Ordóñez was one of three AP members voted onto San Sebastián's city council, the party's first representatives in Gipuzkoa. In 1989, with his party now rebranded as the People's Party (PP), he stood unsuccessfully for the Congress of Deputies in his home constituency, but was elected to the Basque Parliament in 1990. In 1991, his party was the most voted for the city council, and he became deputy mayor.

Ordóñez was running for mayor in the 1995 Spanish local elections when he was fatally shot in the head. His wife since 1990, Ana Iríbar, had given birth to their son Javier months earlier. She set up the Fundación Gregorio Ordóñez in December 1995. His grave at the Polloe Cemetery has been vandalised several times, and his family have left the region due to intimidation.

Assassins Valentín Lasarte and Francisco Javier García Gaztelu were convicted in 2006. The latter, known as "Txapote" and also responsible for killing Miguel Ángel Blanco and Fernando Múgica, received 30 years in prison and a €500,000 fine to the family of the deceased.
