= Verea =

- Municipality
- Verea
- Flag Coat of arms

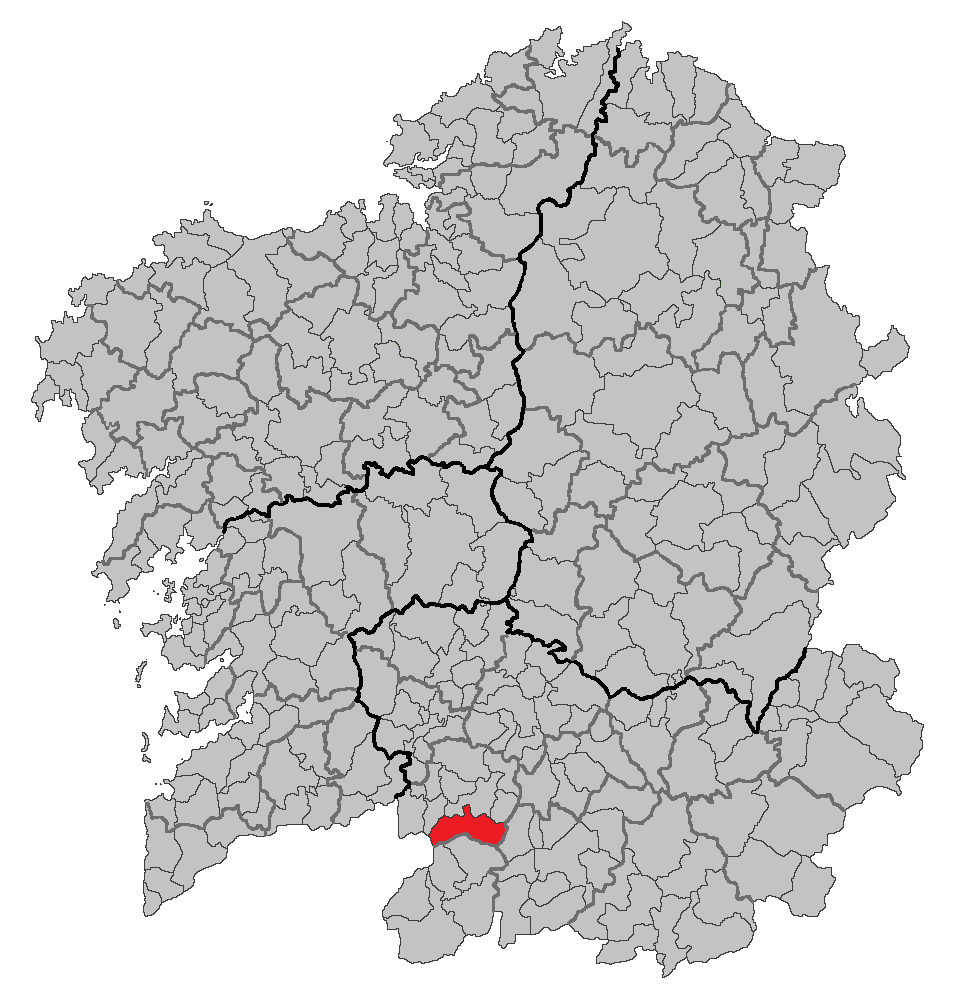
- Location in Galicia

- Location in Spain
- Coordinates: 42°05′38″N 7°59′37″W
- Country: Spain
- Autonomous community: Galicia
- Province: Ourense
- Comarca: Terra de Celanova
- Capital: Carballo

Government
  - Mayor: José Antonio Pérez Valado (BNG)

Area
  - Total: 94.2 km^{2} (36.4 sq mi)
- Elevation: 737 m (2,418 ft)

Population (2025-01-01)
  - Total: 974
  - Density: 10.3/km^{2} (26.8/sq mi)
- Time zone: UTC+1 (CET)
  - Summer (DST): UTC+2 (CEST)
- Website: concellodeverea.com

Verea is a municipality in the province of Ourense, in the autonomous community of Galicia, Spain. It belongs to the comarca of Terra de Celanova.

According to the National Statistics Institute of Spain (INE), Verea had a total population of 964 in 2023.

It has an area of 94.23 km², divided into forty population centers divided into eleven parishes. The municipal capital is in the town of Carballo.
