= Ramirás =

- Municipality
- Flag Coat of arms

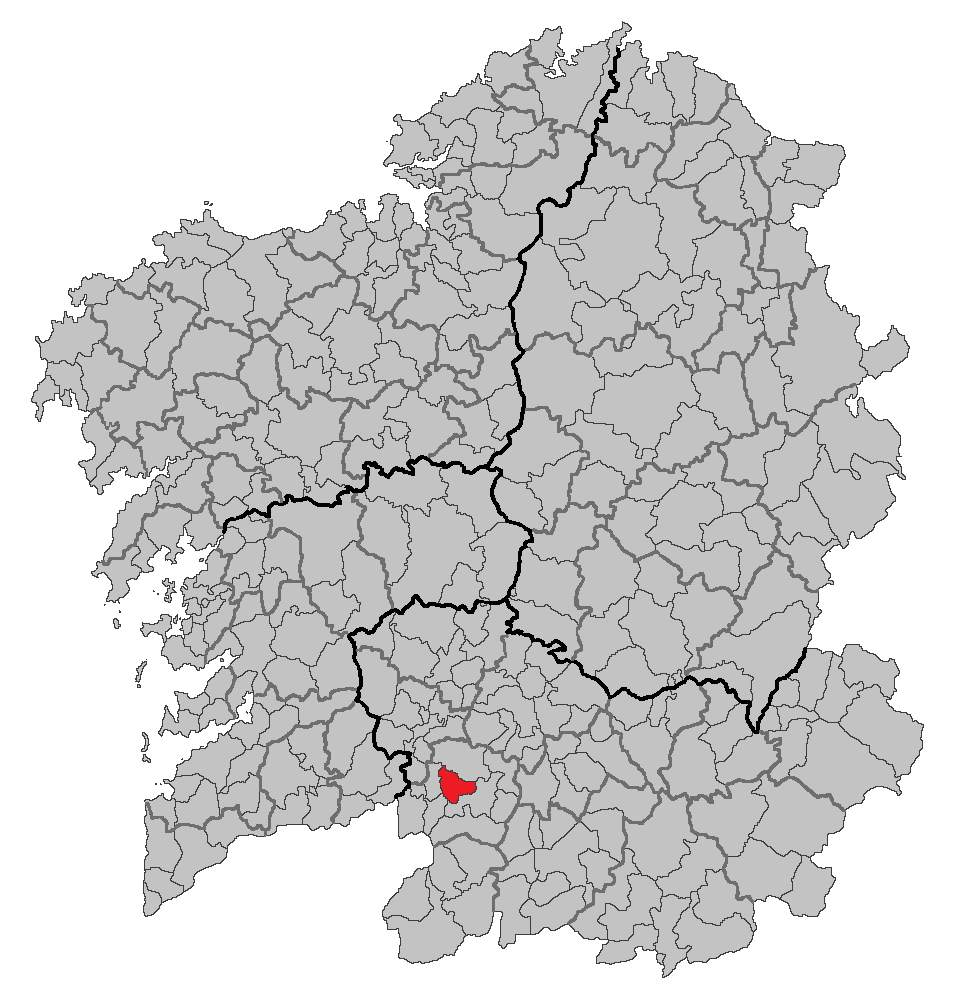
- Location in Galicia

- Location in Spain
- Coordinates: 42°17′01″N 8°01′07″W
- Country: Spain
- Autonomous community: Galicia
- Province: Ourense
- Comarca: Terra de Celanova

Government
  - Mayor: Isabel Gil Álvarez (PSdeG-PSOE)

Area
  - Total: 40.7 km^{2} (15.7 sq mi)
- Elevation: 318 m (1,043 ft)

Population (2025-01-01)
  - Total: 1,485
  - Density: 36.5/km^{2} (94.5/sq mi)
- Time zone: UTC+1 (CET)
  - Summer (DST): UTC+2 (CEST)
- Website: www.concelloderamiras.gal/

Ramirás is a municipality in the province of Ourense, in the autonomous community of Galicia, Spain. It belongs to the comarca of Terra de Celanova.
