= Quintela de Leirado =

- Municipality
- Coat of arms

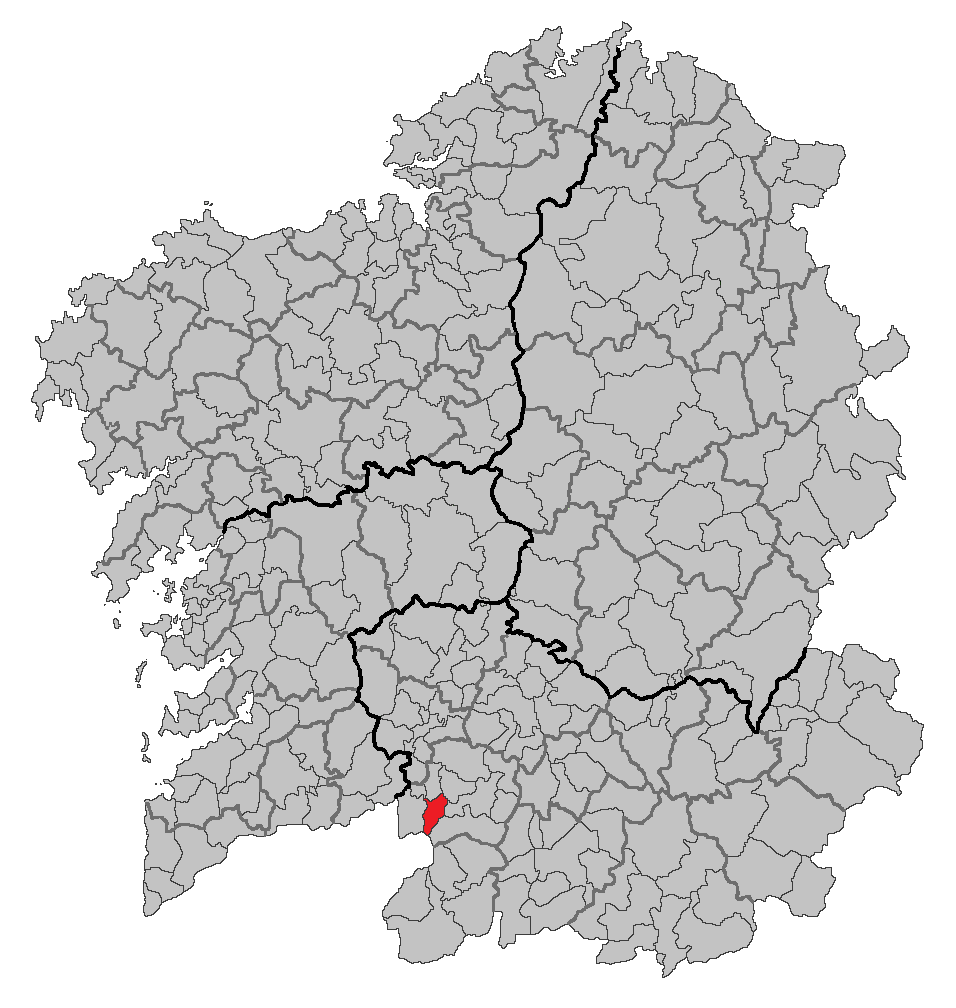
- Location in Galicia

- Location in Spain
- Coordinates: 42°08′N 8°06′W
- Country: Spain
- Autonomous community: Galicia
- Province: Ourense
- Comarca: Terra de Celanova

Government
  - Mayor: José Antonio Pérez Cortés (PP)

Area
  - Total: 31.3 km^{2} (12.1 sq mi)
- Elevation: 380 m (1,250 ft)

Population (2025-01-01)
  - Total: 587
  - Density: 18.8/km^{2} (48.6/sq mi)
- Time zone: UTC+1 (CET)
  - Summer (DST): UTC+2 (CEST)
- Website: www.quinteladeleirado.es/

Quintela de Leirado is a municipality in the province of Ourense, in the autonomous community of Galicia, Spain. It belongs to the comarca of Terra de Celanova.
