= Pioz =

Pioz, Spain
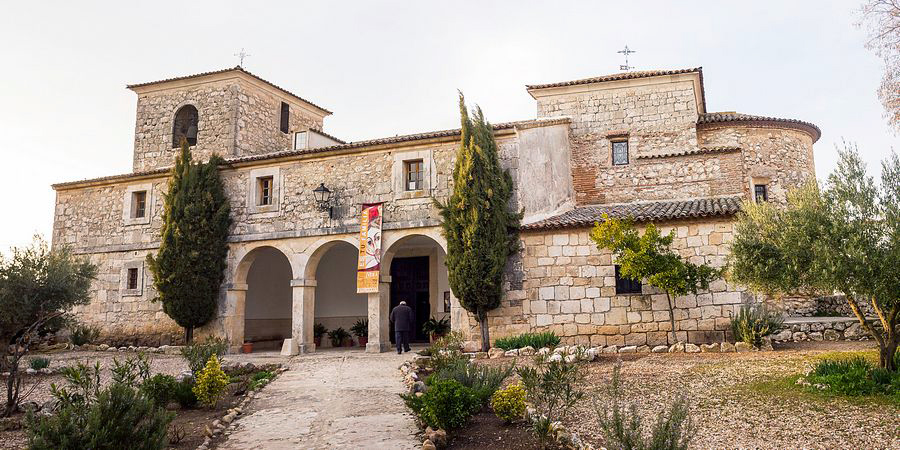

- Coat of arms

- Location within Province of Guadalajara Location within Castilla-La Mancha Location within Spain
- Country: Spain
- Autonomous community: Castile-La Mancha
- Province: Guadalajara
- Municipality: Pioz

Area
  - Total: 19.44 km^{2} (7.51 sq mi)
- Elevation: 876 m (2,874 ft)

Population (2025-01-01)
  - Total: 5,261
  - Density: 270.6/km^{2} (700.9/sq mi)
- Time zone: UTC+1 (CET)
  - Summer (DST): UTC+2 (CEST)

Pioz (Spanish pronunciation: [pjoθ]) is a municipality located in the province of Guadalajara, Castile-La Mancha, Spain.

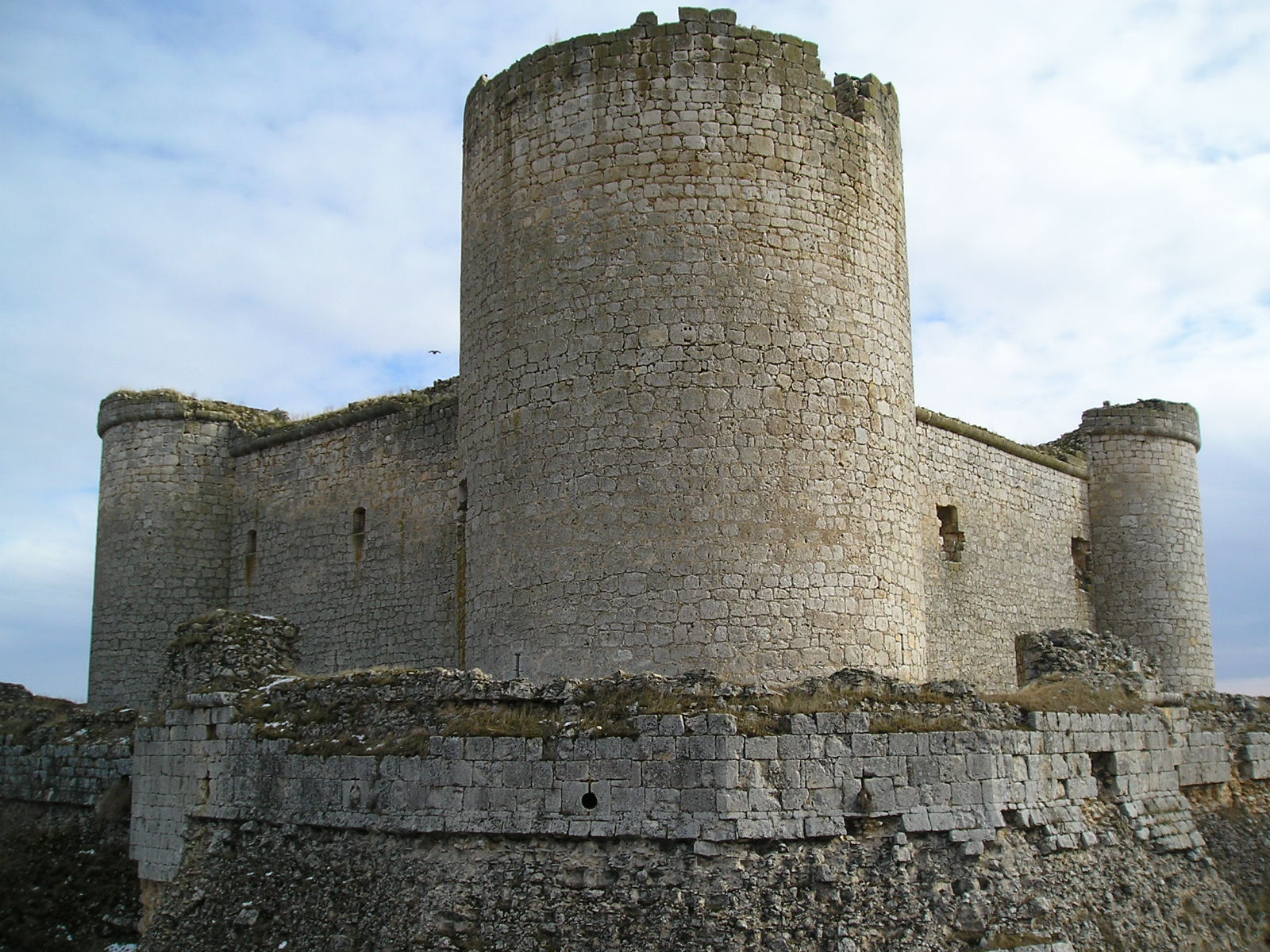
Castle of Pioz
