= Cartelle =

- municipality
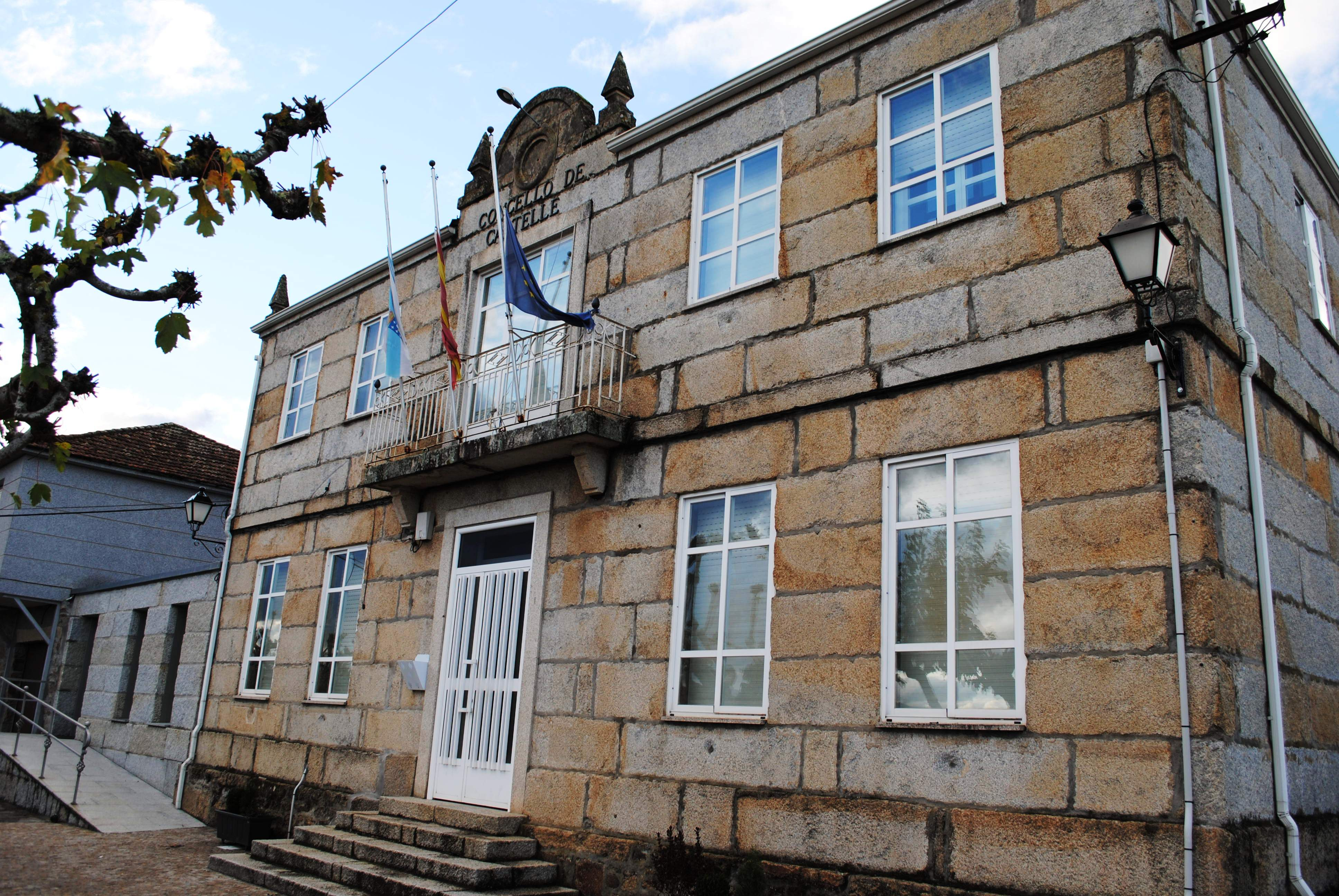
- Town hall.

- Coat of arms

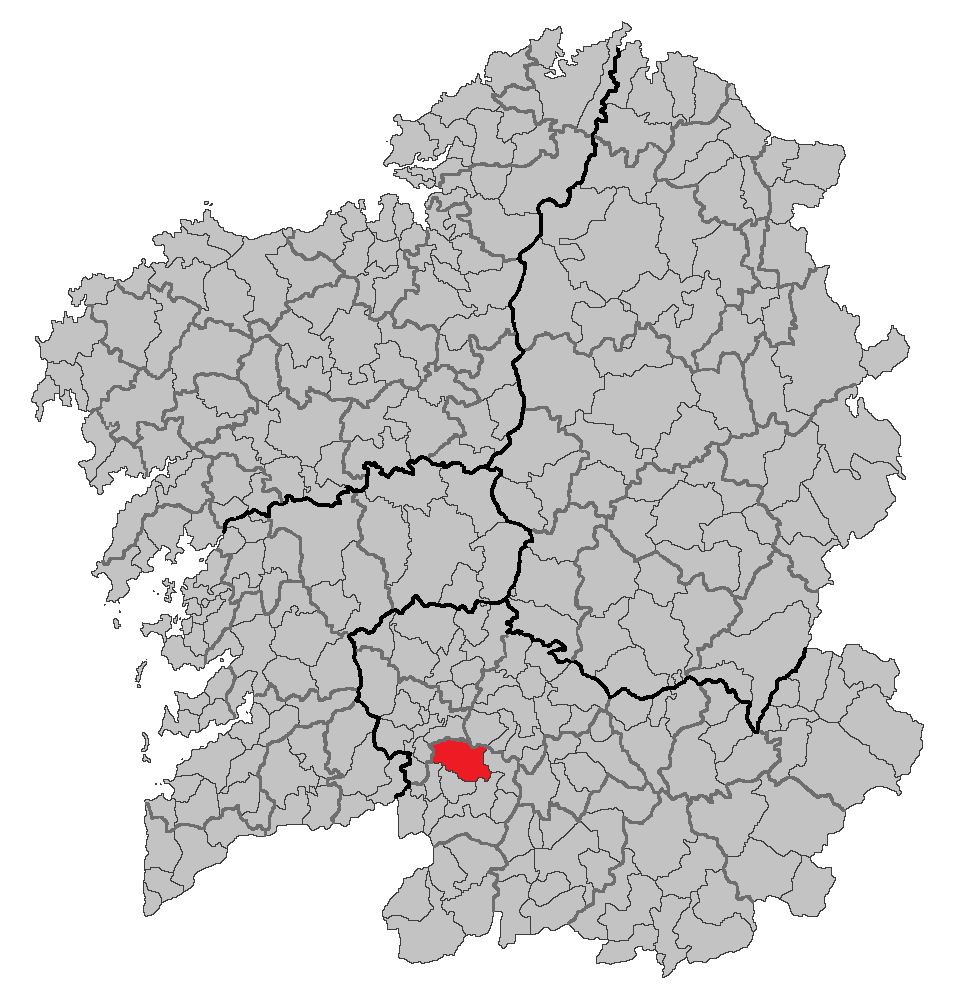
- Location in Galicia

- Location in Spain
- Coordinates: 42°14′57″N 8°04′08″W
- Country: Spain
- Autonomous community: Galicia
- Province: Ourense
- Comarca: Terra de Celanova

Government
  - Mayor: María del Carmen Leyte Coello (People's Party)

Area
  - Total: 94.3 km^{2} (36.4 sq mi)
- Elevation: 356 m (1,168 ft)

Population (2025-01-01)
  - Total: 2,466
  - Density: 26.2/km^{2} (67.7/sq mi)
- Time zone: UTC+1 (CET)
  - Summer (DST): UTC+2 (CEST)
- INE municipality code: 32020

Cartelle is a municipality in the province of Ourense, in the autonomous community of Galicia, Spain. It belongs to the comarca of Terra de Celanova.
