= A Bola, Ourense =

A Bola
- municipality
- Coat of arms

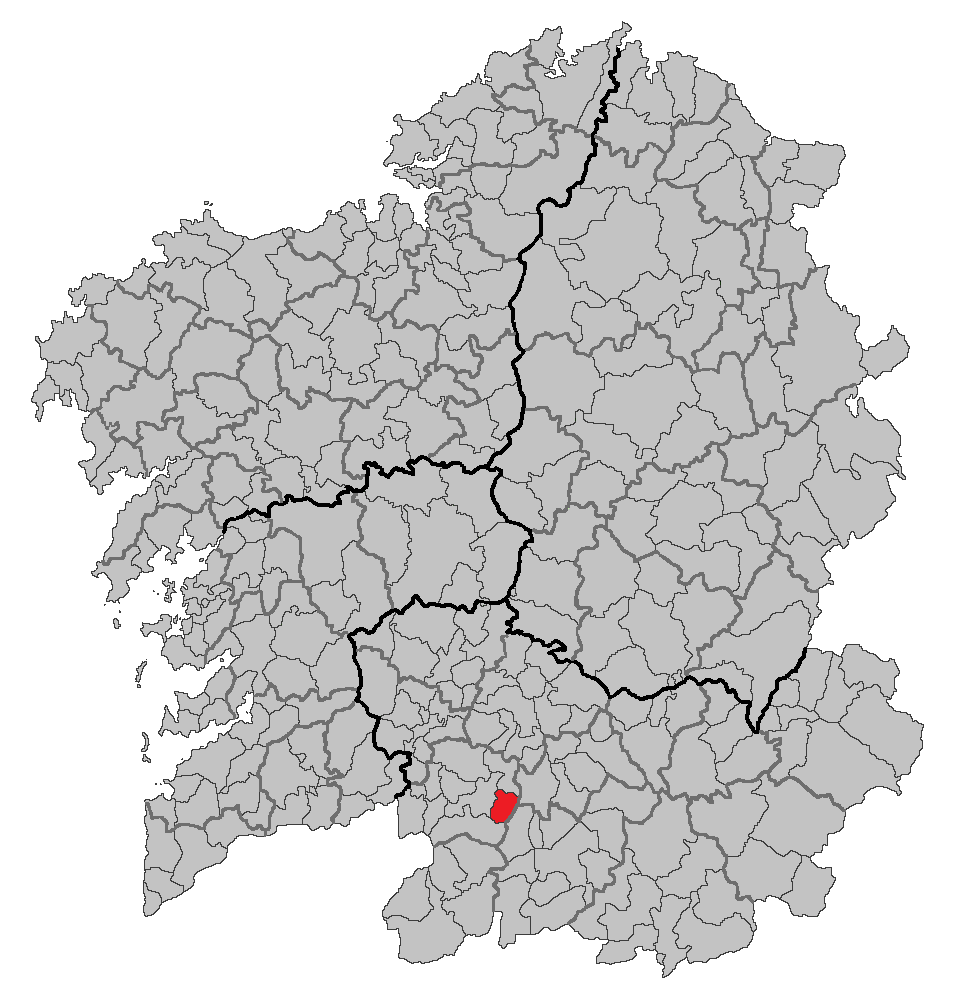
- Location in Galicia

- Location in Spain
- Coordinates: 42.152°N 7.914°W
- Country: Spain
- Autonomous community: Galicia
- Province: Ourense
- Comarca: Terra de Celanova

Government
  - Mayor: María Teresa Barge Bello (BNG)

Area
  - Total: 34.9 km^{2} (13.5 sq mi)
- Elevation: 515 m (1,690 ft)

Population (2025-01-01)
  - Total: 1,139
  - Density: 32.6/km^{2} (84.5/sq mi)
- Time zone: UTC+1 (CET)
  - Summer (DST): UTC+2 (CEST)
- INE municipality code: 32014

A Bola is a municipality in the province of Ourense, in the autonomous community of Galicia, Spain. It belongs to the comarca of Terra de Celanova.
