= Francisco Javier García Gaztelu =

Basque terrorist

- Born: 12 February 1966 (age 60); Galdakao, Spain
- Other names: Txapote, Perretxiko, Jon, Xabier, Otsagi
- Citizenship: Spanish
- Organization: Euskadi Ta Askatasuna
- Known for: Multiple high-profile political assassinations
- Status: Convicted
- Criminal charges: Kidnapping and murder

Francisco Javier García Gaztelu (12 February 1966), alias "Txapote", is a Basque separatist terrorist who is responsible for the assassination of several Basque politicians. He is also known by the aliases Perretxiko, Jon, Xabier, and Otsagi, among others. He was part of the "hard wing" of Euskadi Ta Askatasuna (ETA) and never showed any sign of repentance for his actions or condemned those of the group.

Arrested in 2001, he currently serves multiple sentences, adding up to 500 years of imprisonment.

== Criminal activities ==
Txapote began his career, like many ETA activists, through Kale borroka urban violence. He was sentenced to one year in prison for throwing a Molotov cocktail at a French car dealership in his home town of Galdacano in 1987.

He later joined ETA's Vizcaya commando until an August 1991 shootout in Bilbao with the Basque regional police, during which fellow etara Juan María Ormazábal (Turko) was killed, along with officer Alfonso Mentxaka. Txapote then fled into hiding, possibly in Mexico, until his return at the end of 1994, when he joined the commando Donosti, led by José Javier Arizkuren Ruiz, alias Kantauri. Identified by the police, he went again into hiding, this time in France around 1995. Txapote returned to Spain in 1996 and participated in the murder of Spanish socialist lawyer Fernando Mugica. He took over his group's command after the capture of Kantauri at the beginning of 1999.

According to experts, Txapote represents the hard line within ETA that opposed the group's 1998 truce. He is credited with the operational restructuring of some twenty commandos and the strengthening of ETA's terrorist activity during the months following the truce, as well as the preparation of multiple operations following the break of this truce in 1999.

== Capture and trial ==
The investigation into the theft of a die-cutting machine in Irun in November 1999 led the police to ETA member Ibon Muñoa, who in previous years had provided logistical support to the Donosti Command. Muñoa declared that he had met with Txapote in Anglet, France.

Txapote's arrest took place on February 22, 2001, while he was eating on the terrace of the Havana Cafe restaurant with Stephane Robidart, a French member of ETA that was providing logistical support to the group. This arrest took place shortly after ETA assassinated two workers of the Elektra company in San Sebastian in their attempt to kill socialist councilman Iñaki Dubreuil Churruca with a car bomb.

The trial took place in June 2006. Txapote invoked his right not to testify. Although he refused to intervene on the first day, García Gaztelu used his right to the last word to acknowledge being an "ETA militant" and affirm that ETA "would not abandon its struggle for the freedom of Euskadi".

García Gaztelu was sentenced to 50 years in prison as the material author of the murder of Miguel Ángel Blanco; because of his attitude, the court also prohibited him from approaching the Biscayan town of Ermua for five years after his release from prison. In the trial for the murder of socialist Fernando Múgica, he was sentenced to 82 years in prison and forbidden to visit San Sebastián, the city where the murder was committed and where the Múgica family lives, for six years after his release from prison.

Overall, Francisco Javier García Gaztelu has been sentenced to more than 450 years in prison.

== Let Txapote vote for you, Sanchez! ==
In August 2022, García Gaztelu was transferred from the Estremera Prison near Madrid to one in the Basque Country. In September 2022, the slogan "Let Txapote vote for you!" started being used as a rallying cry by politicians of the conservative People's Party and far-right Vox to attack Prime Minister Pedro Sánchez.

Its wide dissemination in the campaign for the 2023 general elections prompted the Collective of Victims of Terrorism, through its president Consuelo Ordóñez (whose brother Gregorio was murdered by Txapote), to condemn the use of "this repugnant slogan that causes pain among the victims and their families". The position was decried by representatives of the right, such as Rafael Hernando who despite never having met with Gregorio Ordóñez, pointed out that he "knew better than his sister that he would agree with the slogan".
