= Colectivo de Víctimas del Terrorismo en el País Vasco =

Colectivo de Víctimas del Terrorismo en el País Vasco (Collective of Victims of Terrorism in the Basque Country, COVITE) is an organization for relatives of victims of terrorism in the Basque Country. It was founded in November 1998.

COVITE opposes the Basque abertzale left, which it sees as continuing to legitimize ETA's use of violence. In May 2023 COVITE criticized EH Bildu for including 44 former ETA members on its electoral list. In July 2023 COVITE criticized rhetoric used by the People's Party to link Pedro Sánchez with ETA (specifically the slogan "Let Txapote vote for you"), saying that it trivialized terrorism and politicized victims' memories.
