= A Merca =

- municipality
- Coat of arms

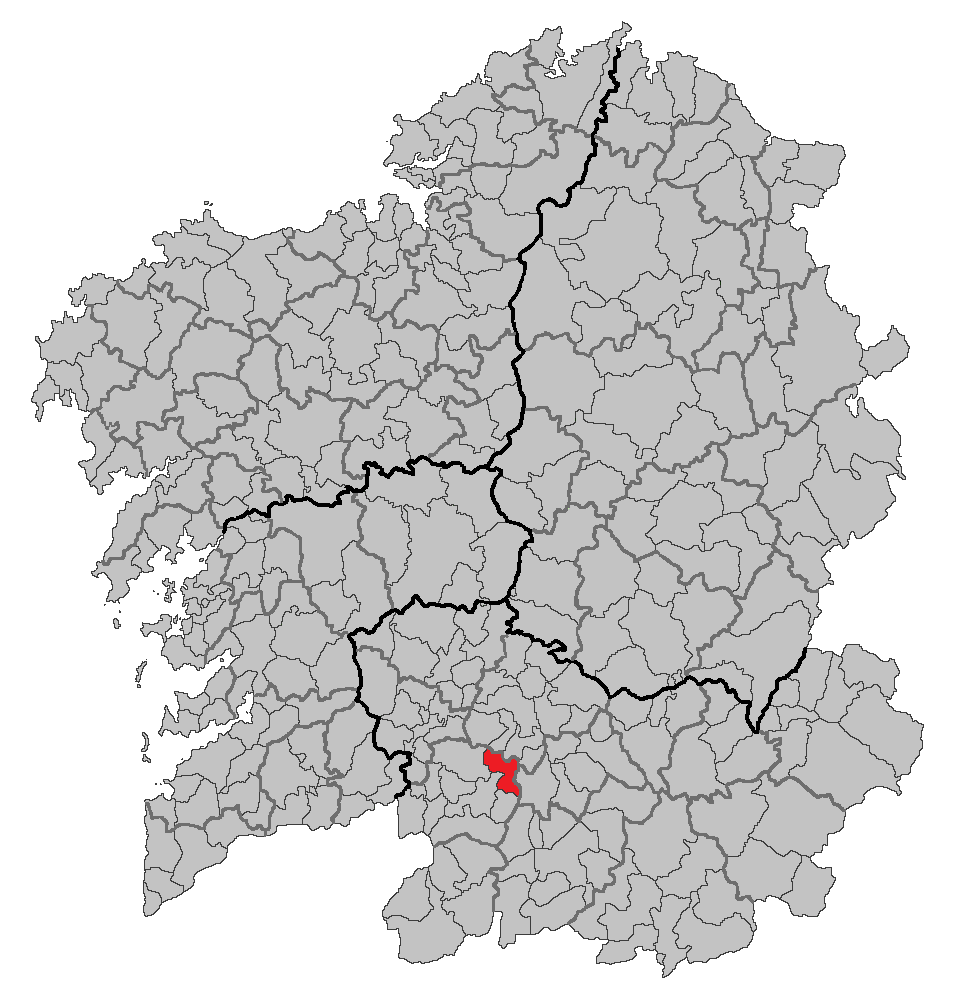
- Location in Galicia

- Location in Spain
- Coordinates: 42°13′23″N 7°54′19″W
- Country: Spain
- Autonomous community: Galicia
- Province: Ourense
- Comarca: Terra de Celanova

Government
  - Mayor: Manuel Jorge Velo Reinoso (People's Party of Galicia)

Area
  - Total: 51.0 km^{2} (19.7 sq mi)
- Elevation: 456 m (1,496 ft)

Population (2025-01-01)
  - Total: 1,962
  - Density: 38.5/km^{2} (99.6/sq mi)
- Time zone: UTC+1 (CET)
  - Summer (DST): UTC+2 (CEST)

A Merca is a municipality in the province of Ourense, in the autonomous community of Galicia, Spain. It belongs to the comarca of Terra de Celanova.
