= Miguel Ángel Blanco =

Spanish economist and municipal politician (1968–1997)

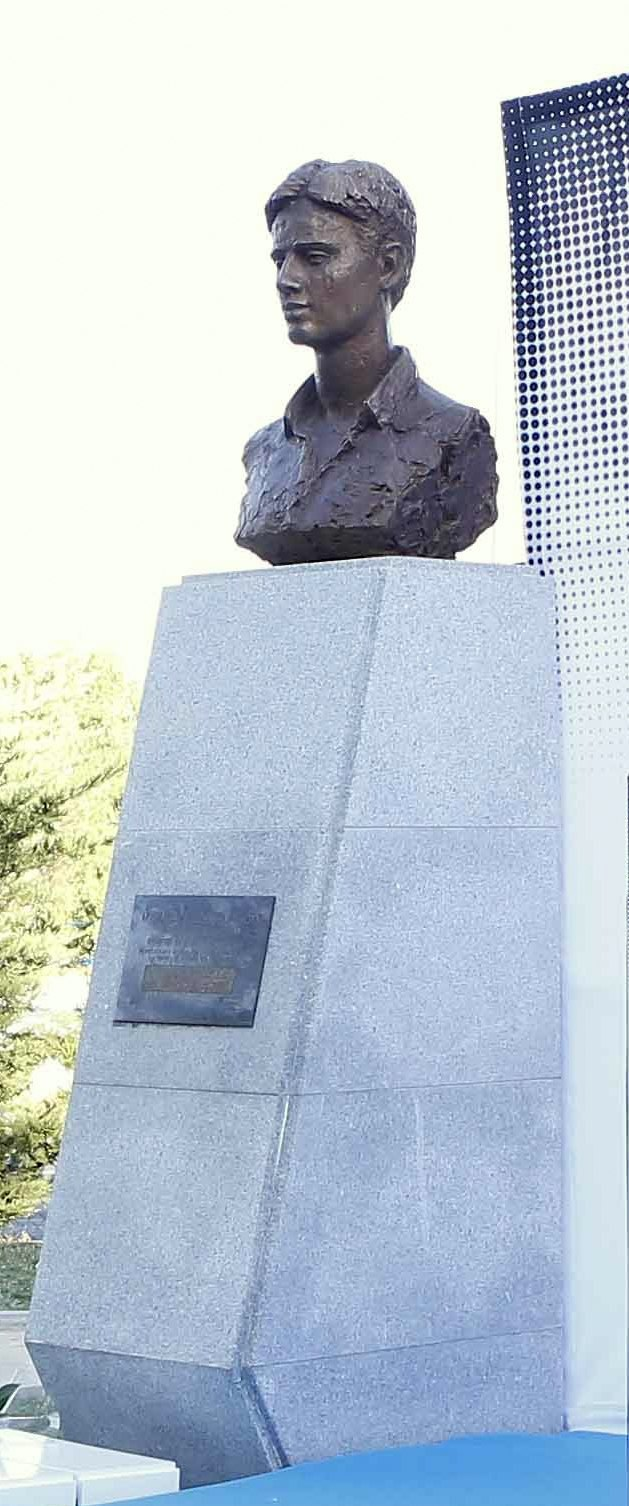
- Miguel Angel Blanco bust in the gardens bearing his name in Madrid

Councillor in Ermua
- In office 28 May 1995 – 13 July 1997

Personal details
- Born: Miguel Ángel Blanco Garrido; 13 May 1968 Ermua, Basque Country, Spain
- Died: 13 July 1997 (aged 29) Lasarte-Oria, Basque Country, Spain
- Cause of death: Assassination by firearm
- Resting place: A Merca cemetery
- Party: People's Party
- Domestic partner: María del Mar Díaz
- Relations: María del Mar Blanco (sister)
- Education: University of the Basque Country

Miguel Ángel Blanco Garrido (13 May 1968 – 13 July 1997) was a Spanish economist and municipal politician and a member of the People's Party, in Ermua, the Basque Country. He was kidnapped and murdered by the Basque separatist group ETA.

== Biography ==
=== Early life ===
Miguel Ángel Blanco Garrido was born on 13 May 1968 in Ermua (Biscay) into a humble family. He had a sister, María del Mar. His father, Miguel Blanco, was a construction worker and his mother, Consuelo Garrido, was a housewife. They were Galician immigrants from Xunqueira de Espadanedo (Ourense, Galicia). Consuelo died on 1 April 2020 from coronavirus, three weeks after her husband's death.

Miguel Ángel Blanco graduated in economics at the University of the Basque Country in Sarriko. For a long time he worked with his father in construction, but he found work at Eman Consulting, in Eibar, where he commuted to every day by train. He also played the drums in the bands Póker and Cañaveral. He was a sports fan and his dream was to walk to Madrid to protest against the possible closure of the Ermua' sports centre. He joined the youth-wing of the People's Party, Nuevas Generaciones, in 1995 and, due to it being a relatively small party in the area where the national parties compete against the PNV, he was the third candidate for the municipal elections in that year. Nevertheless, under the proportional system, he won enough votes to become a member of the town's council.

=== Kidnapping and death ===
On 10 July 1997, Blanco was kidnapped by ETA on his way to see a client. They threatened to assassinate him unless the Spanish Government started transferring all ETA prisoners to prisons in the Basque Country within 48 hours. Hundreds of thousands of people gathered in demonstrations throughout Spain, demanding his release, but 50 minutes after the deadline expired, at 16:50 on 12 July, he was shot in the back of the head. Shortly thereafter, he was found on the outskirts of San Sebastián, with his hands tied, dying. He died in the hospital at 4:30 a.m. on 13 July. He is interred in Faramontaos, A Merca, with his parents.

=== Repercussions ===
Blanco's kidnapping and death had a deep social impact throughout Spain, including the Basque Country, and, in an unprecedented move, even some of ETA's own supporters publicly condemned the killing. The "Spirit of Ermua" was born at this time as was the anti-terrorist organization Foro de Ermua and the Fundación Miguel Ángel Blanco.

2006 saw the beginning of the trial of his kidnappers and murderers, Francisco Javier García Gaztelu ("Txapote") and his girlfriend, Irantzu Gallastegi ("Amaia"). Another kidnapper, José Luis Geresta Mujika, committed suicide two years after Blanco's murder.

== See also ==
- List of kidnappings
- Lists of solved missing person cases
