= New Generations of the People's Party (Spain) =

Political youth organization in Spain

New Generations of the People’s Party Nuevas Generaciones del Partido Popular
- Chairperson: Ignacio Dancausa
- Secretary General: Alonso Nieto
- Founded: 1978
- Headquarters: Génova, 13. 5ª planta. 28004 Madrid
- Ideology: Liberal conservatism Economic liberalism Pro-Europeanism
- Position: Centre-right
- Mother party: People’s Party
- International affiliation: International Young Democrat Union (IYDU)
- European affiliation: Youth of the European People's Party (YEPP); Democrat Youth Community of Europe (DEMYC); European Democrat Students (EDS)
- Website: www.nngg.org

New Generations of the People's Party (Spanish: Nuevas Generaciones, NNGG) is the youth wing of the People's Party. It operates in all Spain and also has structures in other countries. They share the same ideological platform of the PP: a centre-right ideology and economic liberalism, according to their own organisation, reformist centre.

Their main objective is to involve young people in politics through supporting the policies, principles and values of the party by developing the 48th article of the Spanish Constitution.

It has more than 100,000 members throughout Spain, approximately 65% of young people involved in political organizations.

== History ==
New Generations was created as New Generations of the Alianza Popular in 1978, supported by the former Alianza Popular, Secretaries, Jorge Verstrynge and Loyola de Palacio. Its first assembly took place on 17 and 18 April that year and Loyola was elected as the first Chairwoman. Later, in September 2006 during the 12th National Congress in Toledo, she was named Honorary Founder President.

On 13 July 1997 Miguel Ángel Blanco, a member of New Generations and town councillor of Ermua (Vizcaya), was assassinated by ETA.
