= Media circus =

Phrase describing excessive media coverage

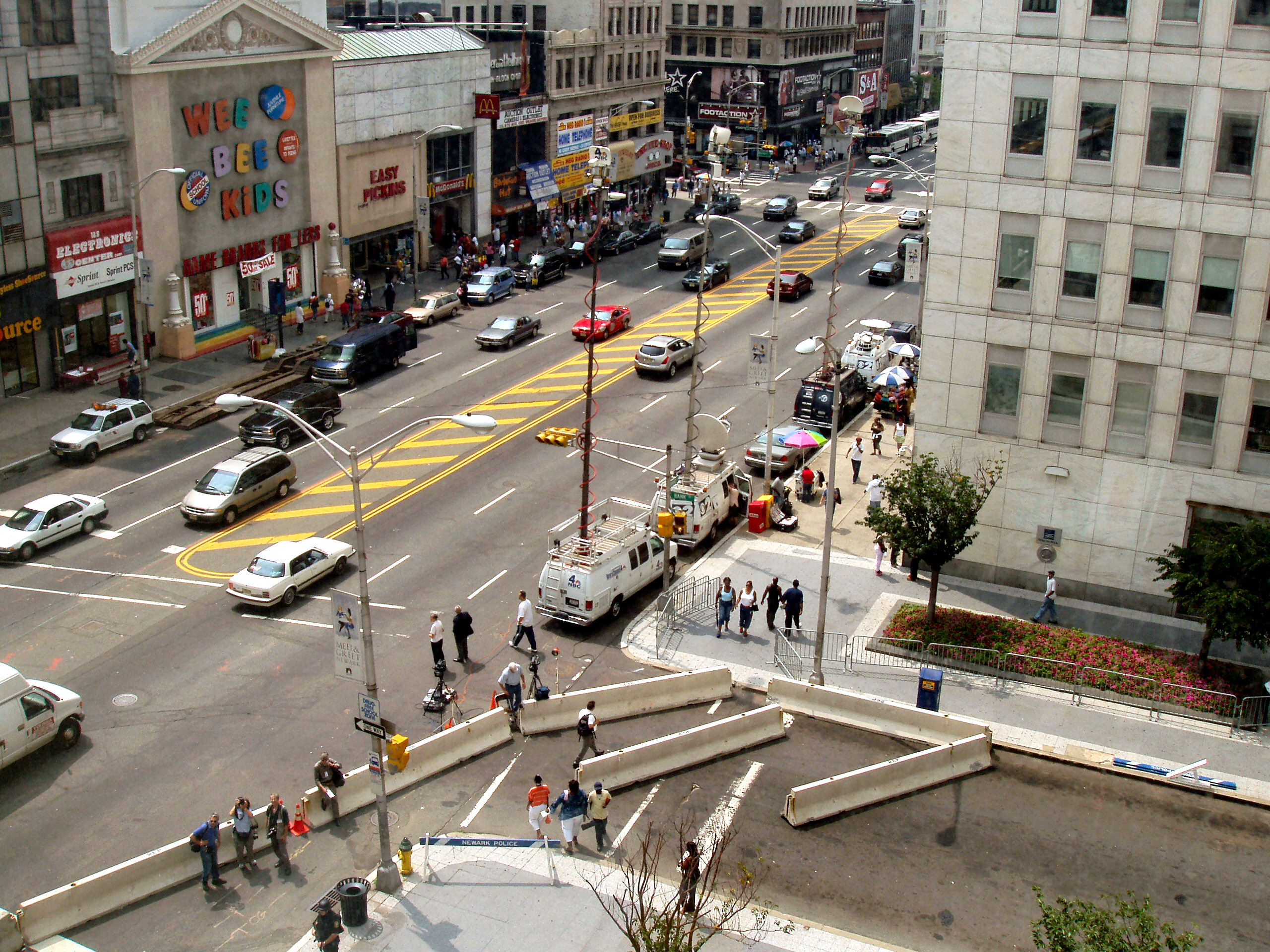
News media satellite up-link trucks and photojournalists gathered outside the Prudential Financial headquarters in Newark, New Jersey, in August 2004 following the announcement of evidence of a terrorist threat to it and to buildings in New York City.

Media circus is a colloquial metaphor or idiom describing a news event for which the level of media coverage—measured by such factors as the number of reporters at the scene and the amount of material broadcast or published—is perceived to be excessive or out of proportion to the event being covered. Coverage that is sensationalistic can add to the perception the event is the subject of a media circus. The term is meant to critique the coverage of the event by comparing it to the spectacle and pageantry of a circus. Usage of the term in this sense became common in the 1970s. It can also be referred to as a media feeding frenzy or simply as a media frenzy, particularly when the media coverage itself becomes the subject of coverage.

== History ==
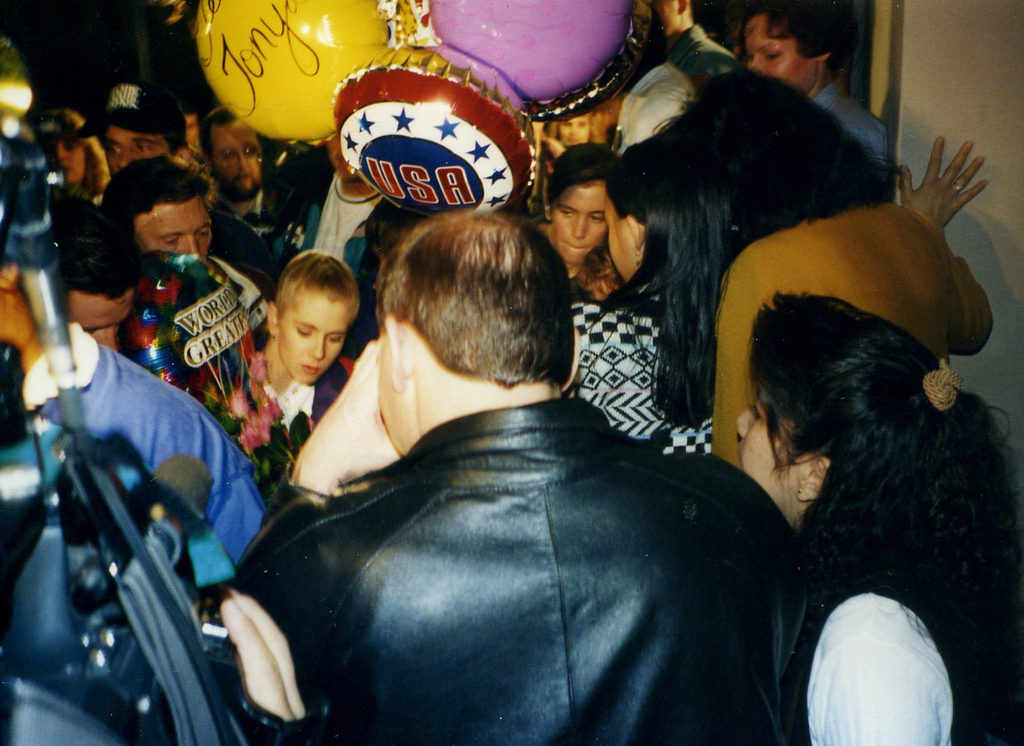
Tonya Harding arriving at Portland International Airport after the 1994 Winter Olympics

Although the idea is older, the term media circus began to appear around the mid-1970s. An early example is from the 1976 book by author Lynn Haney, in which she writes about a romance in which then-world No. 1-ranked American tennis athlete Chris Evert was involved: "Their courtship, after all, had been a 'media circus.'" A few years later The Washington Post had a similar courtship example in which it reported, "Princess Grace herself is still traumatized by the memory of her own media-circus wedding to Prince Rainier in 1956."

Media circuses make up the central plot device in the 1951 movie Ace in the Hole about a self-interested reporter who, covering a mine disaster, allows a man to die trapped underground. It cynically examines the relationship between the media and the news they report. The movie was subsequently re-issued as The Big Carnival, with "carnival" referring to what we now call a "circus". In the film, the disaster attracts campers including a real circus. The movie was based on real-life Floyd Collins who in 1925 was trapped in a Kentucky cave drawing so much media attention that it became the third largest media event between the two World Wars (the other two being Lindbergh's solo flight and the Lindbergh kidnapping).

== Examples ==
Events described as a media circus include:

=== Aruba ===
- The disappearance, and assumed killing, of Natalee Holloway committed by Joran van der Sloot (2005–)

=== Australia ===
- The Azaria Chamberlain disappearance of 2-month-old baby in outback Australia (1980)
- The Beaconsfield Mine collapse (2006)
- 2009 Violence against Indians in Australia controversy
- Schapelle Corby Drug smuggler (2014)
- 2023 Leongatha mushroom murders trial

=== Brazil ===
- The murder of Isabella Nardoni (2008)
- The Imprisonment of Luiz Inácio Lula da Silva

=== Canada ===
- Albert Johnson aka Mad Trapper of Rat River, a trapper fleeing RCMP concerning a dispute with local indigenous over trapping rights evades a manhunt for a month over 240 km, ending in a shootout at a cabin (1932)
- Conrad Black, business magnate of newspapers, convicted of fraud, embezzlement and corporate destruction, imprisoned in Florida (2007)
- Toronto mayor Rob Ford's life, including his usage of drugs, alcohol and involvement with organized crime (2013)
- Paul Bernardo and Karla Homolka (serial killers) convicted for the murders of Tammy Homolka, Leslie Mahaffy, and Kristen French (1987–1992)
- Omar Khadr (detained as a minor at Guantanamo Bay in 2001, transferred to Canada in 2012, released in May 2015)
- Luka Rocco Magnotta, who murdered his Chinese-national roommate and mailed his remains to schools and public offices in 2012 before fleeing to Germany where he was arrested.
- Fatal traffic accident of the Neville-Lake children and their grandfather (2015)

=== Chile ===
- 2010 Copiapó mining accident (2010)

=== Colombia ===
- The Death of Luis Andres Colmenares (2010)

=== India ===
- Sheena Bora murder case
- Death of Sushant Singh Rajput
- Offensive remarks by Ranveer Allahbadia on India's Got Latent

=== Italy ===
- Murder of Maurizio Gucci, by hitmen ordered by ex-wife Patrizia Reggiani (1995)
- Amanda Knox (convicted of the murder of Meredith Kercher; her conviction was subsequently overturned) (2015)

=== Japan ===
- Murder of Shiori Ino

=== Malaysia ===
- Malaysia Airlines Flight 370 (2014)

=== Peru ===
- Joran van der Sloot and the murder of Stephany Flores Ramirez (2010)

=== Philippines ===
- Assassination of a Spanish landowner by a Filipino laborer in Negros in 1890, which was covered by Spanish-owned newspapers in Manila in the year's first half.
- Cabading killings (1961), a case wherein a father killed his family and his son-in-law before killing himself.
- Murder of Lucila Lalu (1967)
- In the 1990s, there were reports on an alleged notorious killer in Negros Oriental targeting women, although these accounts were never confirmed.
- Vizconde massacre (1991)
- Pepsi Number Fever 349 incident (1992)
- Murders of Eileen Sarmenta and Allan Gomez (1993)
- Manila Film Festival scandal (1994)
- Execution of Flor Contemplacion (1995)
- Chiong murder case (1997)
- Murder of Nida Blanca (2001)
- Vhong Navarro assault incident (2014)

=== Romania ===
- Disappearance and alleged murder of Elodia Ghinescu, especially on OTV, which aired a couple hundred episodes on the matter (2007)

=== South Africa ===
- Oscar Pistorius on trial for death of his girlfriend Reeva Steenkamp (2013–2014)

=== South Korea ===
- Suicide and funeral of K-pop star and Shinee member Kim Jong-hyun (2017)

=== Spain ===
- The Alcàsser case (1992)
- The Wanninkhof-Carabantes case (1999–2006)
- The disappearance of Marta del Castillo (2009–2013)
- The José Bretón case (2011)
- The murder of Asunta Basterra (2013)
- The disappearance and murder of Diana Quer (2016–2018)
- The murder of Gabriel Cruz (2018)

=== Thailand ===
- Tham Luang cave rescue (2018)

=== Ukraine ===
- Mykola Melnychenko's involvement in the Cassette Scandal (1999–2000)

=== United Kingdom ===
- The McLibel case (1997)
- The disappearance of Madeleine McCann (2008)
- The life, career, death and funeral of Jade Goody (2009)
- The News International phone hacking scandal
- The Charlie Gard case (2017)
- "Megxit" feud between Meghan Markle/Prince Harry and the royal family (2020–2023)
- The public absence and cancer diagnosis of Catherine Middleton (2023–2024)

=== United States ===
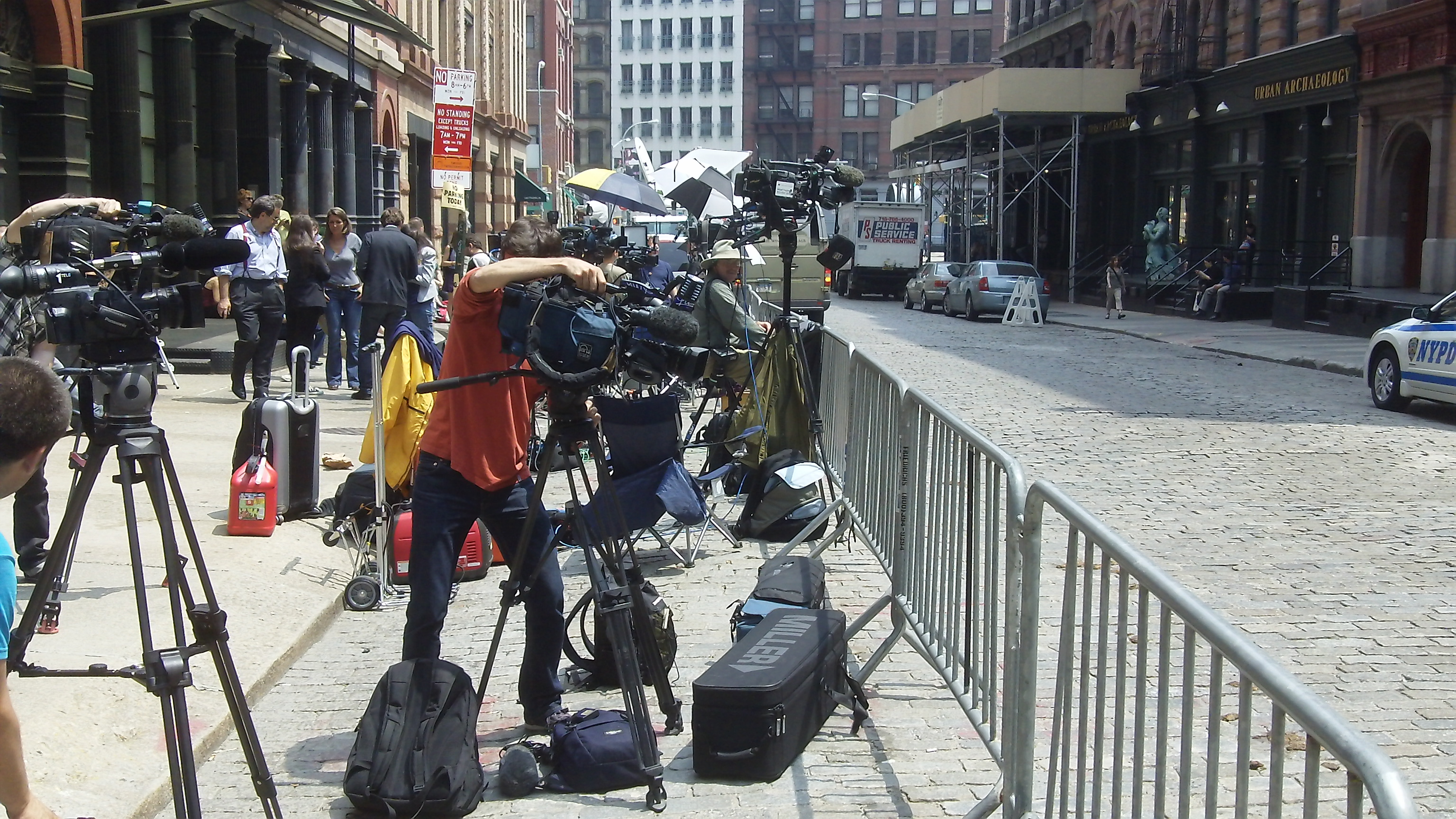
Cameras and reporters in front of the Strauss-Kahn apartment on May 26, 2011

- The 1924 murder trials of Beulah Annan, Belva Gærtner, and several other female suspects in Chicago, adapted into the Chicago franchise by a newspaper reporter
- The 1932 kidnapping of toddler Charles Lindbergh Jr. Journalist H. L. Mencken described the incident as "the biggest story since the Resurrection".
- The 1933 murder trial of Jessie Costello, the "smiling widow"
- The early 1930s string of public enemies, ranging from mafia leaders such as Al Capone to smaller-time gangsters, most enduringly famously Bonnie and Clyde
- The 1954 trial of Sam Sheppard. The U.S. Supreme Court held "massive, pervasive, and prejudicial publicity" prevented him from receiving a fair trial
- The premature birth and death of Patrick Bouvier Kennedy (1963)
- The 1965 littering trial against singer Arlo Guthrie and Richard Robbins, deliberately turned into a local media circus by arresting officer William Obanhein to deter others from repeating their actions
- Coverage of the investigation and trial of the 1969 murders of Sharon Tate and four others by the Manson family
- The murder of John Lennon in December 1980.
- David Gelman, Peter Greenberg, et al. in Newsweek on January 31, 1977: "Brooklyn born photographer and film producer Lawrence Schiller managed to make himself the sole journalist to witness the execution of Gary Gilmore in Utah....In the Gilmore affair, he was like a ringmaster in what became a media circus, with sophisticated newsmen scrambling for what he had to offer"
- The rescue of baby Jessica McClure (1987)
- The O. J. Simpson murder case (1994–1995)
- The Blizzard of '96 (1996), "...this storm ...so hyped by the media in the same way that the O. J. Simpson murder case became hyped as the "Trial of the century"
- The Clinton–Lewinsky scandal (1998)
- The Elián González custody conflict (2000)
- The Summer of the Shark (2001)
- The trial of Scott Peterson for the murder of his wife Laci Peterson (2004), "The circus became even more raucous when Peterson went on trial for murder in 2004"
- The trial of Martha Stewart (2004), "The stone-faced Stewart never broke stride as she cut a path through the media circus"
- The runaway bride case (2005)
- The escape of and manhunt for Ralph "Bucky" Phillips (2006)
- The disappearance of Stacy Peterson (2007)
- The alleged teenage "pregnancy pact" at Gloucester High School (2008)
- The Casey Anthony murder trial (2011), "Once again, it was relentless media coverage that in large part fed the fascination with the case", Ford observed
- The killing of Trayvon Martin (2012), "Here is where the media circus takes a decidedly ugly turn", Eric Deggans wrote
- The murder of Travis Alexander (2013), where Jodi Arias was found guilty of first-degree murder
- The killing of Cecil the lion (2015)
- The murder of George Floyd and the protests that followed (2020)
- The killing of Gabby Petito (2021)
- The Casey White prison escape (2022)
- Will Smith slapping Chris Rock (2022)
- The Johnny Depp v Amber Heard trial (2022)
- The 2022 University of Idaho killings (2022)
- The various scandals surrounding George Santos (2022–2023)
- The trial of Alex Murdaugh (2023)
- The Titan submersible explosion (2023)
- The killing of Brian Thompson and arrest of suspect Luigi Mangione (2024)
- The disappearance of Nancy Guthrie (2026)
- Outside the home of Cole Tomas Allen in Torrance, California, who instigated the 2026 White House Correspondents' Dinner shooting (2026)
- The Killing of the Clancy children and the trial of Lindsay Clancy (2026)

== See also ==
- 24-hour news cycle
- Cause célèbre
- CNN effect
- Deviancy amplification spiral
- "Dirty Laundry" (Don Henley song)
- Feiler faster thesis
- It's Not News, It's FARK
- Richard Jewell
- Media scrum
- Missing white woman syndrome
- Paparazzi
- Perp walk
- Political theatre (disambiguation)
- Sensationalism
- Silly season
- Trial by media
- Trial of the century
- Yellow journalism
