= Murder of Asunta Basterra =

Murder of 12-year-old Chinese-Spanish child in 2013

Asunta Basterra
- 永芳
- Born: Fang Yong; 30 September 2000; Yongzhou, Hunan, China
- Died: 21 September 2013 (aged 12); Santiago de Compostela, Galicia, Spain
- Parent(s): Alfonso Basterra Camporro (father); Rosario Porto Ortega (mother)

Asunta Yong Fang Basterra Porto (born Yong Fang; 30 September 2000 – 21 September 2013) was a Chinese-born Spanish girl whose body was found in Teo, A Coruña, Galicia, Spain, on 22 September 2013, shortly before her thirteenth birthday. The coroner determined that she had died by asphyxiation and had been given at least twenty-seven lorazepam pills on the day of her death, more than nine times a high dosage amount for an adult. The investigation into the death became known as the Asunta Basterra case (Spanish: Caso Asunta Basterra).

Asunta's adoptive parents, Rosario Porto and Alfonso Basterra, were found guilty of her murder on 30 October 2015. According to court documents, the couple had periodically drugged their daughter with lorazepam for three months and finally asphyxiated her before disposing of her body. The parents, who maintained their innocence, were sentenced to eighteen years in prison. Porto died by suicide in prison in November 2020.

The case attracted widespread media interest in Spain and around the world, as well as a "statement of concern" from the Chinese Ministry of Foreign Affairs. The death of Asunta Basterra inspired numerous documentaries and a drama series, The Asunta Case, which premiered on Netflix in April 2024.

== Background ==
Asunta Basterra was born Yong Fang in 2000 in Yongzhou, Hunan, China. At nine months old she was adopted by Alfonso Basterra Camporro (born 1964) and María del Rosario Porto Ortega (1969–2020), an affluent Spanish couple from Santiago de Compostela, Galicia. Asunta was the first Chinese child to be adopted in the city of Santiago and one of the first in all of Galicia. Asunta was said to have been a gifted child, being a talented ballet dancer, violinist, and piano player who skipped a year in school. She was also very close to her maternal grandparents, who died the year before her death.

Asunta's adoptive mother, Rosario Porto, came from a prominent Galician family. Her mother, María del Socorro Ortega Romero (1933 – 12 December 2011), was a highly regarded university lecturer of art history. Her father, lawyer Francisco Porto Mella (18 December 1925 – 26 July 2012), was an honorary consul of France. They died seven months apart, both suddenly at home, in 2011 and 2012, respectively.

Porto studied law at the University of Santiago de Compostela and practiced at her father's firm after graduation. She also claimed to have attended the London High School of Law in England, which The Guardian confirmed does not exist. In 1997 she was appointed consul of France, inheriting the role from her father.

Porto met journalist Alfonso Basterra, a native of Bilbao, in 1990. The two married in 1996 and lived in a large flat that had been given to Porto by her parents. Rosario suffered from flare-ups of Lupus erythematosus, which led doctors to advise against pregnancy, so the couple decided to start an adoption process in China. In 2001, they travelled to China and adopted 9-month-old Asunta from the Guiyang Welfare Institute.

On 5 January 2013, Alfonso discovered his wife's infidelity when he checked her emails. On the 8th they argued and separated. At first there were unpleasant scenes; for instance, Rosario felt harassed because Alfonso sent her constant messages with reproaches and accusations. They were divorced by mutual consent effective 14 February. Alfonso Basterra went to see a psychologist and with time, the couple reached an equilibrium. He took care of the girl and, in exchange, received some financial assistance from Rosario, who continued to suffer from her lupus illness as well as depressive episodes. They lived in close quarters and he could be with the daughter whenever he wanted. Asunta split her time between the two homes, walking the short distance between them.

On 26 June, Rosario was admitted to the Neurology Department of the Hospital Clínico de Santiago due to a worsening of her illness, with dizziness, instability when walking and drooping of an eyelid, remaining in the hospital until 1 July. Her ex-husband reached a pact with her: he would take care of her and their daughter on the condition that she cut off her relationship with her lover, which she accepted.

On the night of the 4th to the 5th of July, an unexplained incident was said to have occurred between the early hours of 2:30 am and 4:30 am. An unknown assailant allegedly tried to strangle Asunta in her room. Rosario claims that the keys were carelessly left in the door. Awakened by noises, she got up and went to her daughter's room, where a man of strong build and short stature wearing latex gloves had his hands around her daughter's neck. This man would subsequently be described in the press as "the man in black". According to Rosario's account, she grabbed the man but he forcefully pushed her and ran away. Surprisingly, Rosario did not call anyone for help.

There are different interpretations of this incident. Some believe that it was purely an invention of the mother, others that it was a first attempt at murder carried out by the mother or the parents, or an excuse to give her lorazepam. At the trial, Rosario's neighbour was certain no one entered the house that night because her dogs did not bark.

Rosario still did not proceed to file a complaint. Asunta told her best friend by WhatsApp that someone had tried to kill her that night, but then did not speak to her about it again. On an outing with another friend, Asunta told the story with signs of distress and the mother of the friend contacted Rosario, urging her to report it. Rosario went to the police station in Santiago, ultimately deciding not to file a report, although she told the friend's mother that she had done so.

On 9 July, Basterra brought Asunta to her music class despite her showing signs of drowsiness and dizziness. He claimed that Asunta was having allergies and that an antihistamine had caused this reaction. Later, on 22 July, a similar incident occurred with the headmistress noting Asunta was unable to play well, half asleep, and struggling to walk. When questioned, Asunta stated that her mother had given her a foul-tasting white powder that left her asleep for hours.

In August, Rosario suffered from a bout of depression and anxiety, and Alfonso took care of her. Asunta spent the month away from her parents, first with her godmother, from 30 July to 22 August, in Vilanova; and to the countryside on 28 August with her caregiver, a woman who helped Rosario with the housework. During this period of absence, her parents called her every day, but did not visit her. Asunta seemed cheerful, happy, and carefree.

== Death and investigation ==
Asunta was first reported missing by her parents at 10:17 pm on Saturday, 21 September 2013. They had eaten lunch together at her father's home that afternoon. Asunta was seen on a bank's security camera at 2 pm walking to her father's house, and appeared on that same security camera at 5:21 pm returning home to her mother's flat. Porto was seen on the same security camera walking home at 5:28 pm.

Porto initially told investigators that she had left home at around 7 pm, leaving Asunta at home doing homework. She said that she had driven alone to the family's country house in Teo, located about twenty minutes outside Santiago, and that when she returned to her apartment at 9:30 pm, Asunta was missing. Porto said that she called Asunta's father and many of her friends, none of whom had seen her.

Investigators later recovered CCTV video footage of Porto and Asunta at a gas station on the route toward Teo at 6:20 pm, contradicting Porto's timeline and story that she had left Asunta home that afternoon. After being made aware of the video, Porto changed her story, this time saying that Asunta had briefly gone with her to the country house, but that she quickly took her back to Santiago because the child had wanted to do homework. Porto claimed that after dropping Asunta off at home, she went to a sporting goods store to buy an item for Asunta's ballet class, but did not go in after realizing that she had left her purse in Teo. Porto claimed she then returned to the country house in Teo to retrieve her purse, then went to a gas station but did not fill her tank because she realized she did not have her discount card.

Police examined the video footage from thirty-three security cameras around Santiago and found no video of Porto's car on any of the roads she claimed to have driven on that afternoon. Investigators came to believe that Porto and Asunta arrived at their house in Teo just after 6 pm, and that Porto left the house around 9 pm.

Asunta's body was discovered in the early morning hours of 22 September 2013, at around 1 am, on the side of a small mountain road in the parish of San Simón de Ons of Cacheiras, in the municipality of Teo (just 5 km from Rosario Porto's country house in Montouto, also in Teo), by two young people who alerted the emergency services, who identified the body of the missing girl. Not long after, Porto and investigators went together to the country house, where Porto was told not to touch anything since the house could be a crime scene. Porto told police that she needed to use the bathroom; an officer followed her upstairs, and found her attempting to retrieve the contents of a wastepaper bin in the bedroom. The bin contained a piece of the same type of orange twine that Asunta's limbs had been tied with when her body was found. Forensic scientists were ultimately unable to determine whether or not the discarded piece had come from the same roll used in the murder.

On 24 September, Rosario Porto was arrested and investigated for an alleged crime of homicide. A day later, Asunta’s father, Alfonso Basterra, was also arrested and investigated.

In June 2014, Examining Judge Vázquez Taín concluded the pre-trial investigation, giving way to the process of opening trial. In October, the Sixth Section based in Santiago completed the final judicial procedures. The selection of the popular jury began in May 2015, with the trial scheduled to begin between 23 June and 17 July of the same year, but there were some delays and it was finally in early October 2015 when the trial began in the Provincial Court of A Coruña, with 84 witnesses and 60 expert witnesses.

On 30 October 2015, the jury appointed by the Court of Santiago de Compostela unanimously found both Alfonso Basterra and Rosario Porto guilty of the murder of Asunta Basterra. In May 2016, the High Court of Justice of Galicia in A Coruña corrected the verdict, finding that it was not proven that Alfonso Basterra got into the car and accompanied the mother. Therefore, the high court found that it was the mother who caused the asphyxiation. Even so, the high court upheld Alfonso Basterra's sentence for planning and collaborating in the murder. In October of the same year, the second chamber of the Supreme Court upheld the sentence of the High Court of Justice of Galicia.

The investigation into Asunta's death was named Operación Nenúfar ("Operation Water Lily") by detectives, who noted that in the moonlight, the girl's body in her white shirt appeared to be floating above the ground like a flower.

== Reconstruction ==
The parents' activities could be reconstructed in the hours leading up to their daughter's disappearance and death, thanks to testimonies, surveillance cameras, and records from phones and digital devices:

1:55 pm. Asunta leaves her home;
2:00 pm. She passes a bank branch camera on her way to her father's flat, with whom she is going to have lunch;
2:30 pm. The mother arrives at Alfonso's house.
4:59 pm. The father's mobile phone records a call from his flat;
5:21 pm. Asunta walks past the same camera, back to her mother's flat;
5:28 pm. Rosario Porto also walks back to her flat, she states that she stayed in the house for a few minutes so she could smoke a cigarette without the girl present;
5:38 pm. Asunta's mobile phone registers a connection, located in her mother's flat in Santiago;
5:43 Three calls were made from the landline at Porto's home to Porto's mobile phone. All three ended up on voicemail. The caller is unknown, although it could have been Asunta calling her mother.
6:09:48 pm. The Banco Sabadell camera records Rosario Porto on her way to the garage.
6:12:21 pm. Rosario Porto is recorded on a different camera, on her way to Xeneral Pardiñas number 7, where she keeps her car in the garage that belonged to her parents, a green Mercedes 190.
6:14:57 pm. Rosario's Mercedes leaves the garage.
6:15:20 pm. The Mercedes was recorded by a camera in Montero Ríos. It would be between this moment and the next recording that the girl gets into the car, according to both the prosecution's account and Rosario Porto's latest statement, where she says that after picking up her car, she remembered she had to stop by her house to get a bag for the swimsuits. There, according to her statement, Asunta decided she wanted to go with her to Teo. Therefore, Asunta gets into the car in the two-block stretch where the entrance to her building is located.
6:20:00 pm. The Mercedes is recorded by a camera on the corner of Doctor Teixeiro and Avenida de Argentina.
6:20:20 Rosario's car is registered by the Galician Parliament's camera.
6:22 pm. The car driven by Porto goes around a roundabout on the way to Teo and a gas station camera records it; in the passenger seat, a small figure wearing a white t-shirt, which can only be Asunta, is seen;
6:23 pm. The girl and Alfonso Basterra were seen in the vicinity of Porto's home by an acquaintance from her classes at the Alliance française, who was shopping. Although the witness says this happened around 6:00 or 7:00 PM, the shopping receipt indicates a purchase time of 6:21 pm and a payment time of 6:23 pm. This would conflict with the photo from the gas station camera. According to the investigating judge, since this testimony came to light two months later, the cash register was not audited to confirm that the time was correctly configured on the device. There would also be an apparent contradiction between the girl walking and the level of drugs later detected in the victim's system. A camera located on that same street did not record the father and daughter passing by;
6:24:54 pm. The witness is recorded walking a few meters along Xeneral Pardiñas street, beyond the intersection with República del Salvador street, on the same Banco Sabadell camera that captured Rosario walking to the garage at 18:09:48. The image was not analyzed in the trial by either the prosecution or the defense.
6:35 pm. The alarm is switched off at the Teo house;
7:00–8:00 pm. Estimated time of Asunta's death according to forensics; the estimate is approximate, as the body's temperature was not taken; Defense experts say that death may have been as late as 10:00 pm;
7:29 pm. The mother makes an internet data connection (geolocated in Teo). She performs a Google search. She states that shortly afterward, her mobile phone turns off and the battery dies. There is no further activity until 9:52 pm;
8:47 pm. The father's mobile phone registers a first connection (geolocated near his apartment), as he begins to make several calls to Asunta's mobile phone, to Porto's mobile phone and to the landline at Porto's address.
8:53 pm. The Teo house alarm is switched on again; at that approximate time, a neighbor greets Porto as she leaves the villa in her car but does not see the girl;
9:28 pm. A camera from the Galician parliament records the return of Rosario Porto from Teo.
Between 9:44:36 and 9:06:55 pm the father appears on the cameras passing again and again, up to nine times, in front of the lens of the bank branch;
9:05 pm. Asunta's mobile phone registers one connection because her father is calling her from his cell phone;
10:31 pm. The parents report Asunta's disappearance at the central police station in Santiago de Compostela;
0:39 am. (approx.) A neighbor passes by the place where the body was later found without seeing anything unusual;
1:30 am. (approx.) A young couple find the body of the girl on their way to the parish of Oza;
1:39 am. The Civil Guard is notified that two people reported finding a body;
7:00 am. The body is taken from the scene.

During the examination of the body, the forensic experts did not take a rectal temperature for fear of destroying or contaminating evidence, as sexual assault was suspected. Nor did they take a temperature in any other way, for example in the ear or nasal cavity, nor did they take the ambient temperature, so that the time of death could not be established. The body was lying on the slope for almost four hours, and twelve hours in a cold room, before vitreous humour was removed from the eye, another procedure for estimating the time of death, which prevented an accurate calculation. The two professors of forensic medicine called by Rosario Porto's defence stated that "the interval established in the autopsy report is not clearly substantiated".

== Research ==
In a first version of the events, Rosario Porto had declared that she left Asunta at around 7:00 pm at her home in Santiago de Compostela, and that when she returned a couple of hours later, the girl was no longer there. The security cameras show that Rosario had gone to the garage much earlier than she stated, an error she attributed to nervousness. The manner and location in which the body was abandoned led investigators to suspect the victim's family.

At the start of the investigation, when the agents tried to reconstruct her route, Rosario commented that, before heading to Teo to pick up some swimsuits, she had stopped in a double row in front of her apartment door to pick up a bag.

Upon finding the image from the gas station camera and discovering that in the mother's car, at 6:21:24 pm, in the passenger seat there was a short person wearing white clothes, undoubtedly Asunta, the police deduced that Rosario had lied.

On Tuesday, 24 September, after the cremation of her daughter's body, Rosario was arrested and charged due to the inconsistencies and contradictions in her statements.

The following day, Alfonso Basterra was also arrested and charged. After learning the results of the toxicology report, investigators suspected him because he had bought large quantities of lorazepam for his ex-wife.

For three days, the parents were held in two nearby cells in the Civil Guard's cells, where all their conversations were recorded without their consent by order of the examining judge. Later, the Provincial Court of A Coruña annulled the validity of these recordings and prohibited their use in the trial.

The mother modified her testimony when she learned of the existence of images from security cameras in which she was seen in the car with the minor on her way to Teo. According to the new version, when Porto went upstairs to get a bag, the girl told her she was bored and wanted to go with her, so they went together to the country house. After the mother deactivated the villa's alarm, Asunta changed her mind and said she wanted to return to Santiago to continue with her homework. Porto took her back around 6:50 p.m., leaving Asunta near her father's house without being able to specify the exact location, and returned to her house in Montouto. The return trip from Teo took much longer than the trip there. Porto stated that this was due to traffic, a stop at a gas station (though she didn't fill up, and no security cameras captured her there), and because she headed back to Decathlon but didn't go in because she realized it was getting late. The prosecution considered this explanation implausible and an attempt to justify the long return trip.

An analysis of Asunta's hair revealed that she had consumed high doses of lorazepam three months before her death, which is associated with the testimonies of dizziness and drowsiness provided by the teachers at the music academy. The charge was changed from manslaughter to murder, due to the aggravating factors of malice aforethought and kinship.

A cousin of Rosario Porto's father told reporters that there was an economic motive in the crime because the daughter was the universal heir of the grandparents and pointed out that Rosario could have killed her parents. The Civil Guard ruled out an economic motive: Rosario was the only heir and her parents had not made any donation to their granddaughter during her lifetime. A year before Asunta's death, the grandmother had died in bed at the age of 77 and the father, seven months later, at 88, also in bed, both from natural causes. The death certificates were signed without any problems and there had been no suspicions about these two deaths. The Civil Guard was unable to investigate further because of the cremation of the bodies. The examining magistrate denied that any enquiries were being carried out into these two deaths.

In early October, the Civil Guard's central crime laboratory identified the genetic profile of a man, a young Colombian resident in Madrid, when testing two samples of fabric cut from Asunta's T-shirt. The young man had been accused of raping a minor at a party at his home, but was later acquitted. That is why a condom with samples of his semen was found in the same laboratory and the same cold room where Asunta's T-shirt was analysed. The young man had a solid alibi, as he had dinner that night in Madrid, with his girlfriend, his sister and a friend of his sister, they had posted photos of the dinner on Facebook that night and the receipt for the dinner that night also coincided with what was seen in the photos. Even so, the defences of Rosario Porto and Alfonso Basterra would try to direct suspicion towards this third man, who the press dubbed "the semen man".

On 30 October, El Mundo published as an exclusive report an alleged leak of the recordings of Asunta's parents in jail. This information was subsequently repeated by almost all the major media outlets in the country. The programme Espejo Público (Public Mirror) on Spanish TV channel Antena 3 leaked the first recordings of Asunta's parents in pre-trial detention. Actors reproduced the words of the detainees. Rosario: "You and your little games... Have you had time to get rid of that?" Alfonso: "Shut up, maybe they're listening to us". These phrases do not appear in the official police transcript nor are they heard in any other part of the conversations that were not transcribed, yet they were accepted and repeated for years, before and after the trial, by almost all the Spanish media, including public television.

"Probably the most serious episode in the whole matter of the conversations in the prison cells is how one television station quite literally invented some sentences; if they had been used in the trial they would have been exceedingly incriminating, although if the conversations had been used in trial it would immediately have become obvious that this part was an invention.

The programme in question was broadcast in October 2013; they used actors to recreate the conversations and quite simply added the following dialogue on, wich [(sic)] does not appear in either the official transcription or in any other part of the conversations that they did not transcribe. Rosario and Alfonso supposedly said:

R: You and your little games. Did you have time to get rid of that? A: Shut up, they might be listening to us.

The first and last of these three sentences are purely fictitious, while the second one is an adaptation of what Rosario did say: "You didn´t have time to do that, did you?" The problem is that these sentences were then taken as an accepted truth and repeated ad infinitum in the newspapers and magazines and on the televisión (even on the National News on TVE-1, on 30 October 2013).

These fabricated conversations were not used in the trial because all the recordings were declared inadmissible for violating the fundamental right to privacy of communications. According to the Provincial Court's decision, "they may not be used in any way in the proceedings." Interestingly, another part of the genuine recordings did indicate that Rosario and Alfonso had not met that afternoon to put the girl in the car.

At the end of December, Alfonso Basterra's laptop and mobile phone appeared in his home in Santiago. Alfonso's lawyer wrote to the court that Basterra was going to stop renting and that in that flat "the computer of the accused and his telephone have always been there". The two objects that the police had been looking for appeared immediately, although the small apartment had already been thoroughly searched by the agents three months earlier, even though they were not looking for a computer but for evidence of the crime such as sedatives or medications. Alfonso Basterra's brother and sister testified at the trial that the computer had been there the whole time and that they were surprised it hadn't been taken away.

In June 2014, it was leaked that Alfonso Basterra had visited many pornographic websites including a high proportion of "pornographic videos and images showing women with Asian features," which sparked numerous rumours about his sexual tendencies. It was never made public how many of the videos or images depicted Asian women, but the officers' report on the contents of the laptop concluded that the defendant visited all kinds of erotic and sexual websites, not only concerning Asian women. At the trial, the technicians were unable to prove that the hard drive had been replaced.

The defendant's Facebook page was also commented on in various media. Among the 264 people added to his page, there were friends related to his work, spas and tourism, personal friends and workers in the Galician press or television, but also four foreign Asian girls. These girls shared photos of themselves in erotic poses on Facebook, but none of these photos appeared on the defendant's Facebook page.

Also in June, a specialized unit of the Civil Guard, the Crimes Against Persons Unit recovered deleted photographs from Asunta's mobile phone (formerly owned by her mother). These photographs were considered compromising. They included images of the girl sleeping, with her eyes closed, wrapped in a duvet. Particularly compromising were photographs taken after the girl's ballet end-of-year party. Nine-year-old Asunta appeared dressed as a cabaret dancer, wearing a corset and fishnet stockings. This was the costume chosen by the teacher for all the students. Several photographs were taken, and in two of them, Asunta is lying in an armchair with her legs spread over an armrest, looking tired.

Numerous articles and programmes in the Spanish media confused the appearance of the photographs of the girl on the mother's old mobile phone with the pornography and images of Asian women found on the father's computer. Sometimes it was stated that the photographs were on the father's computer, other times the two reports were simply published together without clearly distinguishing that they were two different facts. This created a general opinion of Alfonso Basterra as a paedophile or of the parents as perverts or depraved.

Rosario Porto's lawyer considered the photographs "normal and irrelevant" and claimed that the Civil Guard had been in possession of Asunta's mobile phone for nine months but had allowed them to be leaked to the press at the right time to create a hostile atmosphere towards the parents and try to influence the jury's opinion.

The trial was postponed due to the difficulty in selecting jurors. Of the 36 candidates chosen by lot to form the jury, one had died, another could not be located, three were challenged by the lawyers for the defence due to inaccuracies in the questionnaire they had to fill in beforehand, and sixteen gave various excuses which the president of the court accepted, leaving four short of the minimum of 20 candidates. The trial, which was to begin on 13 June, was postponed until the end of September. On 29 September, the first day of the trial, the four remaining candidates required for jury formation were chosen after more than four hours. Three candidates were rejected by the defence lawyers and one by the prosecution.

Following the jury's verdict and the condemnatory sentence, Rosario Porto's lawyer, José Luis Gutiérrez Aranguren, expressed his opinion that the jury was contaminated by the media and that he would state this in the appeals that he was going to present before the High Court of Justice of Galicia and the Spanish Supreme Court:

"In the case at hand, the impact of the mass media in the formation of a preference for the accusatory thesis in public opinion is ostensible. For example, on 20 November 2013, journalist José Manuel Pan published the following headline on the website of the newspaper La Voz de Galicia: "Rosario Porto killed Asunta in Teo and she alone disposed of the body". "

During the two years between their arrest and trial, countless headlines condemning the parents appeared in the most widely viewed and read media outlets in Spain and the province where they were to be tried: "Asunta's parents conspired to kill the girl through 'perverse reasoning'" (El Mundo ), "The summary reveals that Asunta's murder was a 'prearranged plan' by the parents" (El Mundo), "You and your little games (...) Did you have time to get rid of that?" (El Mundo), “Rosario Porto to Alfonso Basterra: 'You and your little games (...) Did you have time to get rid of that?'” (La Voz de Galicia), “Alfonso Basterra had intimate photos of Asunta and pornographic material of Asian women” (La Voz de Galicia), “Did they kill Asunta because she bothered them?” (El Mundo, the day before jury selection), “Asunta’s father was with the girl when she was poisoned and in two other incidents” (El País), “Asunta case: the cruelty of some targeted parents” (ABC), “Asunta’s parents, conspiring to kill their daughter” (ABC), “Asunta case: the father drugged her, the mother suffocated her, and there are no third parties involved” (ABC), “Why was Asunta Basterra killed? The crime at the hands of her parents, Rosario Porto and Alfonso Basterra" (Telecinco), "The Court sees numerous indications that Basterra participated in the murder of Asunta" (La Opinión A Coruña), "Rosario Porto seems willing to blame the crime on her ex-husband to save herself" (La Opinión A Coruña).

== Verdict ==
At the end of the trial, which lasted more than four weeks and for which 135 witnesses were called, and after four days of deliberation, the jury returned a guilty verdict for both parents that resolved some of the main issues in the case, but also left doubts.

The jury considered (in section 9 of the proven facts) that the time of death was between 6:00 pm and 8:00 pm, for which it gave more weight to the toxicology report on the digestion process than to the autopsy evidence with the analysis of the vitreous humour. Specifically between 6:33 pm and 8:00 pm.

The jury considered it proven (in section 1 of the proven facts) that both parents "repeatedly" and "by common agreement" supplied their daughter with lorazepam, a drug sold as Ativan, which Alfonso Basterra was in charge of buying. They supplied it for at least three months before the death, three times in July and once on 18 September.

The jury also considered it proven (in section 4 of the proven facts) that on the day of her death the parents ate with the daughter at the father's apartment, and that there they gave her a quantity of lorazepam, which was necessarily toxic, in order to asphyxiate her later, when it took effect. Lorazepam takes effect in the first 45 minutes after oral ingestion, but a bank shows that Asunta walked "upright, oriented and fast" on her way from her father's house to her mother's house at 5:21 pm. Alfonso Basterra's lawyer argued in her closing argument that it was not coherent to let the girl out alone at five in the afternoon if after ingesting lorazepam at lunch she should be in a semi-comatose state and anyone could see her or stop her in the street. The witness who claimed to have seen Asunta in the street with her father, at around 6:22 pm, did not observe anything abnormal in her gait.

The jury gave credibility to the testimony of a young woman, three years older than Asunta and a classmate of hers in French classes at the Alliance Française for three years, who claimed to have seen her with her father in the street on the afternoon of 21 September. The young woman had gone with her boyfriend to buy some trainers in a sports shop in General Pardiñas Street. On the way out, she saw Asunta and Alfonso Basterra walking up Avenida de El Salvador and stopping at a pedestrian crossing. She knew both of them well, but did not greet them. The witness's friend did not know them and did not notice them.

The following day, when the classmate found out on Twitter that Asunta Basterra had been found dead, she stated to her relatives that she had seen her and her father the previous afternoon. After two months, given that there was much talk in the media about the father's involvement in the crime and his activities that afternoon, the parents decided to have the daughter testify before the examining magistrate. Until then, they had preferred to keep her away from such a mediatic procedure and to avoid her name being made public.

The purchase ticket and a camera recording from the Sabadell bank in General Pardiñas Street proved that she had indeed been there that day. The witness's purchase ticket, shown at the trial, indicated 6:21 pm as the moment when the barcode was read, and 6:22:23 pm when the cash register was opened. The witness stated that as soon as they paid, they left immediately and she saw Asunta and her father walk past her.

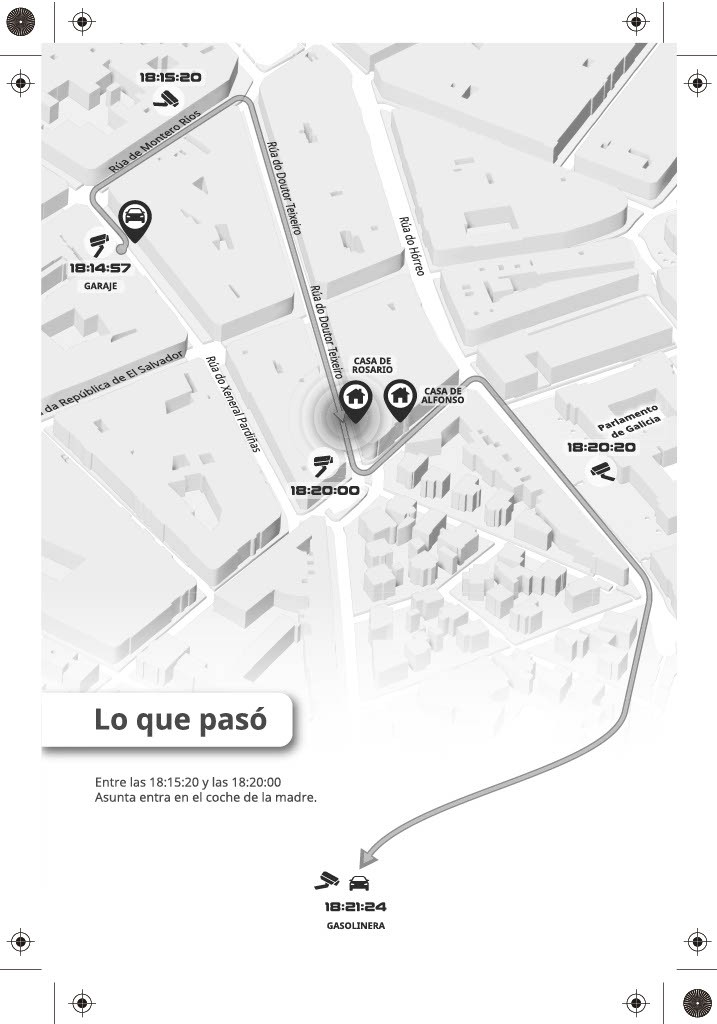
Rosario Porto's car route from the garage to the gas station with the times recorded by the cameras.

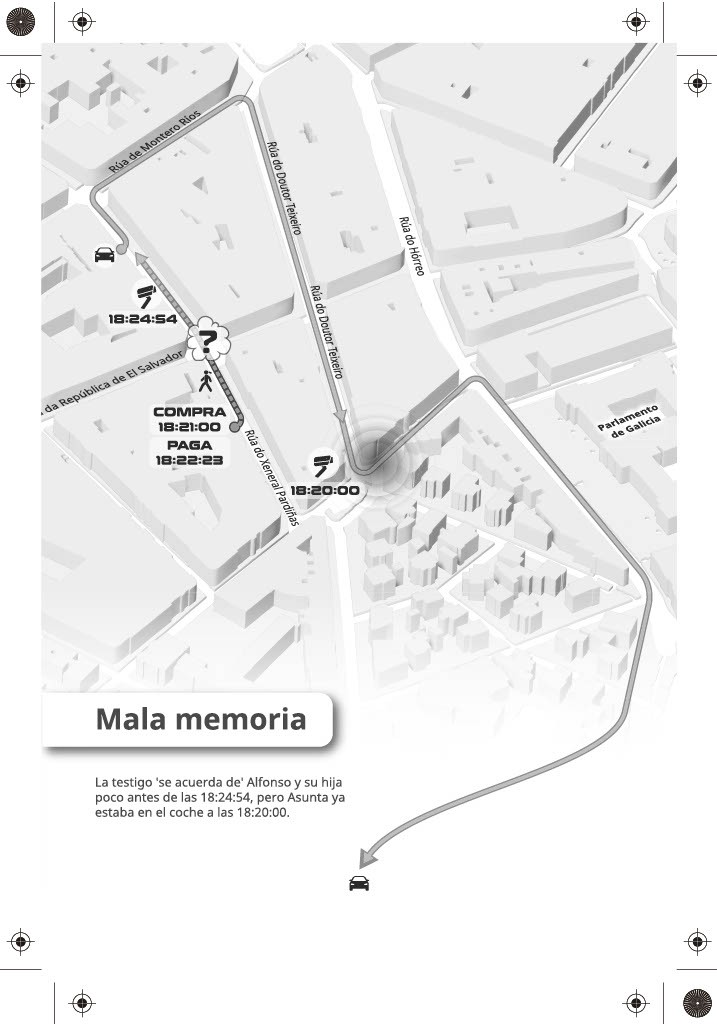
Time discrepancy. According to the cameras, the witness passes by after Asunta has already left.

This would imply a temporal inconsistency with the camera from the Galuresa petrol station, in whose images Rosario and Asunta are in their car on their way to Teo at 6:21:24 pm. Also with the camera from the Galician Parliament which records the Mercedes-Benz at 6:20:21 pm. The cash register of the shop was not examined because two months had passed, but the testimony of the witness that she recognised Asunta and her father on the day of her death was believed by the Jury, although the time was not known with total certainty. Furthermore, the examining magistrate thought that what was important was not the time, which could be wrong on the cash register, but that the witness recognised Alfonso and his daughter without any doubt on the afternoon of the murder, which would indicate that Alfonso had lied when he declared that he had been at home reading all afternoon.

However, the camera of the Sabadell bank shown in the documentary by Bambú producciones shows the witness with her companion at 6:24:54 pm on the same day. This would suggest that the time on the cash register may not be wrong. But, as it is impossible for Asunta to be in two places at the same time, and being seen in her mother's car on the way to Montouto by the camera at the petrol station at 6:21:24 pm and far from where the witness says she saw Asunta with her father, it seems to point to the fact that the witness did not really see her.

If what the witness says is true, Asunta waited at the traffic lights, walked one block to Doctor Teixero street and got into the car, which passes in front of a camera on the corner of his block at 6:20:00 and another in front of Galician Parliament at 6:20:21 pm and the petrol station at 6:21:24 pm, but the witness, without stopping at any traffic lights, reached the Sabadell bank, a distance of about 50 or 60 metres at 6:24:54 pm, four minutes and thirty-three seconds later.

At the trial it was established that the witness was able to see Asunta and her father in the street at 6:23 pm.

In section 7 of the proven facts, the jury states that the camera at the Galuresa filling station was out of time: "in the Galuresa camera at 6:21 pm, taking into account a time difference due to the lack of synchronisation of cameras, Rosario and Asunta are seen in the Mercedes Benz"; however, at no time had there been any talk of a time difference in that camera; on the contrary, when reconstructing the route of Rosario Porto and Asunta that afternoon, the judicial police officers had verified the accuracy of the times:

"However, in the cameras that were searched and recorded and obtained frames of the route that does appear, parliament and Galuresa service station, there was a very detailed specification of 'Here is this time but compared to the real time, there is a difference of seconds' and there was no problem in putting it on record."

José Luis Gutiérrez Aranguren, lawyer for Rosario Porto

"From the time Doña Charo leaves the garage at 6:14 pm until she arrives at the Galuresa at 6:21 pm, this entire itinerary has been checked and collated."

Belén Hospido, lawyer for Alfonso Basterra

The examining judge, when questioning Rosario Porto about the movements of that afternoon, told her: "We even have it timed".

The Sabadell bank camera was not exposed at the trial by either the prosecutor or any of the defendants. The same camera had recorded Rosario walking to the garage to pick up the car two months earlier, and the time on that camera had been inspected. The cash register, on the other hand, was not inspected. Rosario Porto's lawyer: "That box (the cash register of the purchase of the trainers) was never inspected whether it was on time or not, which was done in all the other records of cameras and recordings".

Alfonso Basterra's defence claimed that the witness saw Asunta with her father but on another day, since Asunta and her father had indeed passed by that same street on another day.

If Asunta had taken the sedative at her father's house, lorazepam by oral ingestion takes an hour to have its maximum effect, but according to the witness, who saw her walking around 6:23 pm, Asunta was walking normally. The explanation given by the toxicologists and the forensic expert who conducted the autopsy is that lorazepam is one of the benzodiazepines that has less effect as a muscle relaxant. Asunta could feel a strong drowsiness, but without incoordination of movements or difficulty in walking. The defense lawyers stressed that, with such an intake of lorazepam, Asunta would have been comatose at the time and that the amount ingested was, according to forensic experts, "necessarily toxic". When questioned by the defense, the witness confirmed that Asunta was walking normally and that if she had been walking strangely she would have noticed it.

Another problem left by the testimony of Asunta's young classmate and that was treated only in passing in the Atresmedia documentary is where Alfonso was coming from with Asunta, why he had moved away from her house and from the street where Rosario's Mercedes-Benz passes to return later. It makes no sense if Alfonso Basterra was trying to avoid the cameras and was only accompanying Asunta to get her into her mother's car as discreetly as possible, that is, from the street door directly to the vehicle.

In the report of Asunta's disappearance, Rosario declares that she left her at home, but a few hours after the investigation she adds one more detail: when leaving in her Mercedes-Benz towards the farm, she had stopped in a double line in front of the doorway of her house to get a bag to store the swimsuits she was going to pick up from Teo, at the country house. In her final statement, a few days later, she acknowledges that she stopped in double line, went up to get a bag and Asunta came down with it. For two months, before the contribution of the testimony of the classmate, the agents of the investigation and the examining judge assumed that Rosario had stopped in double line to pick up the girl. They also assumed that Alfonso Basterra had helped Rosario Porto to take the girl down, because she was drugged.

"When you took your daughter down to the car, who helped her into the car? Because your daughter was so drugged that it would have been impossible for her to get in on her own." Examining magistrate, José Antonio Vázquez Taín.

The formulation of the question indicates his belief that the girl did not walk down the street. However, he describes the witness, who changes everything and whose testimony was contradicted by the timestamps on a ticket and a camera, as "totally credible." In the conversations recorded during their detention in the prison cells, the mother asks Alfonso twice if he left the house the afternoon of Asunta's disappearance, which indicates that they did not meet in the street because the question would not make sense if she had seen him. These conversations were not used in the trial because they were considered illegal recordings.

Rosario: Let me ask you something, Alfonso, you didn't go out in the whole afternoon?

Alfonso: No, not at all, don't worry.

Rosario: You're sure, right, Alfonso?

Alfonso: I give you my word of honor, baby. I give you my word of honor, Charo, that I didn't go out.

(Recording of the third night in the prison cells of the Civil Guard Headquarters in A Coruña, 26 September 2013).

The jury considered it proven (in section 9 of proven facts), by the statement of the witness who placed Alfonso with Asunta around 6:22 pm in General Pardiñas street, that Rosario did not stop to pick up a bag and left with the girl, as she had finally declared, but that Rosario stopped to pick up both of them because they were already in the street. Nothing indicated that Alfonso returned to his home and, while "the cameras make it clear that at least Rosario and Asunta are in the car, however, no camera can rule out the presence of Alfonso in it". As no camera picked up the back of Rosario's Mercedes-Benz, it could not be ruled out that he was crouched there.

The High Court of Justice of Galicia corrected this statement. Only the mother could be located in the house in Montouto where the murder took place. The jury's argument was considered "not very rational reasoning" and "incompatible with the logical criteria of induction based on proven facts". Even so, both the High Court of justice of Galicia and the Spanish Supreme Court understood that the father was equally guilty of the same crime and was sentenced to the same penalty because they had planned it together and had intervened with essential acts in executing the plan.

The jury unanimously found Rosario Porto and Alfonso Basterra guilty of the death of their daughter Asunta. They concluded that they sedated her for months and asphyxiated her by suffocation. After finding no "unproven facts", they were against the pardon and the suspension of the sentence. The jury went even further than the prosecutor, who knew the time of the photo of witness Clara Baltar and acknowledged in his final argument the possibility that Basterra did not accompany the mother with the daughter to Teo and that it was the mother who carried out the plan.

After the reading of the verdict, which Rosario Porto listened with more fortitude and to which Alfonso Basterra responded with various gestures of denial, the prosecutor requested 18 years in prison for aggravated murder with aggravating circumstances of kinship and abuse of authority. The popular accusation, represented by the Clara Campoamor association, asked for the "maximum penalty" for the parents, 20 years in prison. Two weeks after the verdict, the sixth section of the Provincial Court of A Coruña finally sentenced the parents to 18 years in prison with special disqualification from exercising parental authority during this period of time and payment of the costs.

The verdict did not discuss the possible motive for the murder, which the investigation also failed to clarify satisfactorily, giving rise to numerous hypotheses and conjectures with little real basis in the press and social networks.

== Sentence and imprisonment ==
On 16 March 2016, the High Court of Justice of Galicia dismissed the appeals of the lawyers of both parents and confirmed the 18-year sentence, although it acknowledged that it was Rosario who suffocated her daughter.

On 22 November, the Supreme Court also dismissed the appeals of the defence, acknowledging that there was no evidence of Alfonso Basterra's presence in the house where the murder allegedly took place, but condemning him all the same "as he participated on an equal footing with Rosario Porto and intervened in essential acts that led to the execution of the criminal act", "without the intervention of the appellant [Alfonso Basterra] the macabre outcome could not have been carried out".

In June 2017, the Constitutional Court rejected the appeal for amparo filed by the defence of Rosario Porto. Likewise, it rejected Alfonso Basterra's appeal, presented by a lawyer assigned by the court, following the resignation of his lawyer Belén Hospido.

Since their imprisonment, Asunta's parents, despite being in the same prison, never met again except in court. They did not maintain any relationship after the sentence.

== Suicide of Rosario Porto ==
Rosario Porto attempted suicide in prison on two occasions. On 24 February 2017, after it was announced that she was going to be transferred to the prison of A Lama, in Pontevedra, she was found unconscious due to an intake of sleeping pills that she had been accumulating and had to be admitted to a hospital. She was subsequently transferred, and on 12 November 2018, in her new prison, she tried to take her own life by hanging herself in the showers with the cord of a sweatshirt around her neck, but the sudden appearance of another inmate saved her. On 12 November she was admitted to the prison infirmary for deep depression.

On 22 March 2020, she was transferred to Brieva women's prison in Ávila, a decision that she did not accept willingly. The anti-suicide protocol was applied to her during the initial phase as well as on another six occasions during her sentence.

As a lawyer, Rosario Porto was able to help her fellow prisoners to prepare legal appeals or to better understand their procedural situation. She had sent letters to the penitentiary institutions and to the Spanish Ombudsman.

While serving her sentence, Rosario Porto took her own life on 18 November 2020, hanging herself from a window with a belt made of sheeting.

== Cultural impact and media depiction ==
In Spain, the disappearance and death of Asunta Basterra attracted more media coverage and public attention than any other crime. The Professional Association of Journalists of Galicia and the Faculty of Journalism of the University of Santiago de Compostela criticised in a statement the news treatment given to the Asunta case. The BNG, Galician Nationalist Bloc, took this criticism to parliament and asked the Xunta, Government of Galicia, to promote compliance by the public and private media with codes of ethics in cases of violence involving minors.

At the end of 2014, crime reporter Cruz Morcillo published El crimen de Asunta ("Asunta's crime"), in which she collected a large number of details about the investigation and the proceedings of the case, which she had covered for Spanish newspaper ABC and El programa de Ana Rosa.

On 6 October 2016, the Basque television ETB 1 broadcast the documentary El caso Asunta, as part of the programme El lector de huesos ("The Bone Reader"), in which the forensic anthropologist Francisco Etxeberria discusses the details of the autopsy.

A four-part documentary about the case, Lo que la verdad esconde: Caso Asunta ("What the Truth Hides: The Asunta Case"), directed by Elías León Siminiani, premiered on Spanish television on 24 May 2017. It was considered a landmark documentary in Spain, which historically has eschewed the true crime genre. It became available internationally on Netflix in February 2019.

In 2018, the English translator based in Santiago, Mark Guscin, published The murder of Asunta Yong Fang. In April 2024, he published the Spanish translation: Lo que nunca te han contado del caso Asunta.

The Asunta Case, a six-part Spanish-language miniseries, was released on Netflix on 26 April 2024 in co-production with Bambú producciones. Created by the producers of the 2017 documentary, this series amalgamates a number of different fictionalized versions of what may have happened. The series features several high-profile Spanish actors such as Candela Peña, Tristán Ulloa, Javier Gutiérrez, María León and Alicia Borrachero. The names of the secondary characters have been changed and their personal lives have also been invented. At the end of each chapter, a note clarifies that the judicial and police plots have been fictionalised to adapt them to the narrative rhythm of a fictional series.

In the fifth episode of the series, two opposing versions of Asunta's death are shown. Civil Guard Ríos states that Rosario Porto acted alone and then Alfonso Basterra decided to support her and pretend with her that someone had kidnapped her daughter; on the other hand, the version given by judge Malvar is that they both did it because the girl knew a secret that could destroy them. In chapter three, around minute 18', the prosecutor tells the examining magistrate that the evidence is not solid enough to order the father's pre-trial detention. When in chapter six, minute 6', the civil guard investigators reveal photographic evidence which strongly suggests that the witness who saw Alfonso with Asunta in the street could not really have seen them, the examining magistrate dismisses their research, stating that the recordings merely show a time difference which may be interpreted in a variety of ways. He is also confident that the defence lawyers will never find that photo. Judge Vázquez Taín stated on RTVE that the series portrays him as a "criminal" and that it has been "a kind of personal revenge".

In May 2024, La Voz de Galicia acknowledged that Rosario Porto's statement, "You and your little games... Have you had time to get rid of that?", which the newspaper had published before the trial, had never actually been made. Similarly, La Vanguardia, which had also published the statement before the trial, released another article four days later with "the actual conversation" in which the notorious statement did not appear.

In June 2024, the writer Julián Peña published a study on the conviction of Alfonso Basterra, titled: The Alfonso Basterra Case. A Re-reading of a Miscarriage of Justice. In it, he argues that Asunta's murder is much better understood if it is considered that it was probably committed by the mother, without the father's help. He reviews what he considers flaws in the investigation and logical errors in the verdict, as well as the negative influence of the media, which created a hostile atmosphere prior to the trial that inevitably affected the proceedings. The author lists and explains the reasons that, in his opinion, demonstrate that the witness did not actually see Alfonso with his daughter in the street, and that therefore her recollection was a false memory. He considers it very unlikely that Rosario, divorced, with a lover and total financial independence, was subjugated to Alfonso. He also considers it very unlikely that Alfonso would entrust his wife, absent-minded, scatterbrained and depressed, with the execution of a complicated murder plan. He observes that the dates of July 4, the first attempted murder, and September 21, the actual murder, coincide with the two moments in which the mother has recovered from convalescence, due to lupus and depression.

Also in June 2024, Inma López Silva publishes "Why Asunta? (¿Por qué Asunta?)", which aims to analyze the case from a gender perspective and offers an alternative to the police investigation. For the author, Rosario Porto was innocent and Alfonso Basterra was the culprit who killed his daughter to harm the mother for her infidelities, so we would be facing a case of vicarious violence. Mark Guscin already discussed this possibility at the end of his book. On the same back cover it states "Why was her mother blamed almost immediately without any evidence to incriminate her" and gives an answer unrelated to the facts: "Rosario Porto, in reality, was a suspect for the investigators, and for public opinion, and therefore for the popular jury, for being three things much more evident and demonstrable than a murder: she was a woman, she was rich and she was intelligent." It does not mention that the mother was the last person who accompanied Asunta before her murder, that she did not declare the truth to the police, and that she changed her version when she learned that there was a recording that incriminated her. Although the back cover describes it as a "thrilling and rigorous chronicle" and boasts "the rigor of the best journalism," the book actually omits fundamental information or distorts the facts: it fails to mention that Asunta told the teachers that "her mother" gave her the white powder that tasted awful; it claims that the photos of Asunta on her mother's cell phone were taken by Alfonso because Rosario was hospitalized, without considering that the photos were taken in June 2011 and the mother's hospitalization occurred two years later, in June 2013; it recalls that the psychiatrists testified as experts at the trial that Rosario's change of story could be due to a memory lapse caused by the medication she was taking, but it seems unlikely that a mother would remember double-parking, going up to the fourth to grab a bag, and continuing her journey, but forget that her daughter left the house with her and they traveled together in the same car. The most glaring error in this theory is the assertion that Alfonso Basterra was the last person seen with Asunta, meaning that the witness Clara Baltar saw Asunta after Rosario brought her back from the house in Teo. This would imply that she saw her, at the very least, ten minutes after 6:33 pm, after having deactivated the villa's alarm system, returned, and left the girl on the street. However, Clara Baltar passed by that location before 6:24:56 pm, and it is completely impossible that the camera footage had a minimum time lag of 20 minutes. The author offers no explanation or information regarding these temporal discrepancies. It would also imply that Alfonso spontaneously committed the crime when his daughter arrived unexpectedly for a visit, but that he knew how to avoid all the cameras and that he counted on no one having seen or recorded his daughter arriving at his house.

On February 26, 2025, channel Cuatro begins the second season of On Guard: Women Against Crime with the title "Asunta, case closed". The documentary presents agent Begoña Rodríguez, who participated as a judicial police officer throughout the entire investigation and was in charge of establishing a close relationship with Rosario Porto. The program, with an audience share of 6.5%, defends that the case was well judged and avoids entering into subsequent controversies.

In February 2025, Alfonso Basterra publishes his first novel, Cito, written from prison. The work is dedicated to his daughter, but it does not deal with the case or life in prison, but rather takes place in the 1940s in a town in Castile and León. It is a satirical story of love and heartbreak with a certain esperpento tone and at times close to magical realism. Shortly afterwards he was transferred at his own request from Teixeiro to the Topas prison (Salamanca). Like Rosario Porto, he has never admitted his guilt, so he cannot access any of the usual prison benefits.

== See also ==
- José Bretón case, murder of siblings by their father in Andalusia
- Anna and Olivia case, murder of siblings by their father in Canary Islands
- Alcàsser Girls, high-profile murder case of Spanish girls in Valencia
- Typhaine case, a case of child abuse and murder that occurred in France in 2009

== Book sources ==
- Guscin, Mark (2018). The Murder of Asunta Yong Fang. Newcastle upon Tyne, UK: Cambridge Scholars. ISBN 978-1-5275-1150-7.
- Morcillo, Cruz (2014). El Crimen De Asunta [Asunta's Crime] (in Spanish). Madrid, Spain: La Esfera de los Libros. ISBN 978-84-9060-239-3.
