= Murders of Anna and Olivia Zimmerman =

2021 child murders in Spain

- Victims Olivia (left) and Anna Zimmerman (right)
- Location: Santa Cruz de Tenerife, Spain
- Date: 27 April 2021; 5 years ago (murders); 28 April 2021 (Gimeno's presumed suicide); 10 June 2021 (discovery of Olivia's body)
- Attack type: Child murder by suffocation, double-murder, familicide, filicide, infanticide, murder-suicide, parental child abduction, disappearances
- Deaths: 2
- Victims: Olivia Zimmermann de Zárate, aged 6 Anna Zimmermann de Zárate, aged 1
- Perpetrator: Tomás Antonio Gimeno Casañas
- Motive: Unknown; possibly revenge against Anna and Olivia's mother
- Monuments: Bronze tribute statue in La Gesta of 25 July children's park

On 27 April 2021, sisters Anna and Olivia Zimmermann, aged one and six years old respectively, were kidnapped by their father, Tomás Antonio Gimeno Casañas, on the island of Tenerife, Spain. On 10 June, the lifeless body of Olivia was found on the seabed of the Canary Islands, 1 km (0.62 mi) deep with the help of sonar. The case had a large impact on Spanish society and media. Anna and Tomás Antonio Gimeno have never been found, but are presumed dead.

== Murders ==
The girls, born as Anna and Olivia Gimeno Zimmermann, were two sisters aged one and six respectively and daughters of Tomás Antonio Gimeno Casañas and Beatriz Zimmermann de Zárate who were kidnapped by their father on the night of 27 April 2021, when he was supposed to have delivered them to their mother. Tomás Gimeno initially took the two girls to the house of their paternal grandparents in Santa Cruz de Tenerife.

Gimeno told Zimmerman that he was going out with the girls to dinner. Anna and Olivia were allegedly murdered minutes after that call at Gimeno's house in the town of Igueste de Candelaria. He allegedly took the corpses of his daughters in his car and stopped at his parents' house without their noticing. That night, Gimeno went to the Puerto Marina de Tenerife, where around 9:30 p.m. he unloaded several sports bags on his boat. He left the port around 12:30 a.m. Earlier, he had called the girls' mother Beatriz, threatening that she would never see the girls or him again.

== Search ==
Tomás Gimeno's boat appeared the next morning, 28 April, floating and without anchor, near Puertito de Güímar. Later, on 29 April, a child restraint seat for vehicles belonging to one of the girls was found floating, and it was reported that bloody remains were found in Gimeno's boat the day before. An investigation was opened, considered one of the most complex that the Central Operational Unit (UCO) of the Civil Guard has had to face, which also intervened in the resolution of the cases of Diana Quer, Asunta Basterra, and Gabriel Cruz. Tomás Gimeno's house in the town of Igueste de Candelaria was searched on 30 April, which continued in subsequent days.

The ship Ángeles Alvariño, from the Spanish Institute of Oceanography, joined the search on 29 May. The ship found an oxygen tank and a duvet cover owned by the girls' father underwater on 8 June, this finding ultimately expanding her presence in Canary waters at least until 15 June.

Finally, at the end of June, it was reported that the oceanographic vessel Ángeles Alvariño had ended the search for the bodies of Anna and her father after a month of searching. The technical report of the Civil Guard concluded that the large number of gullies and underwater crevices made exploration difficult.

=== Olivia's body found ===
After 45 days, on 10 June 2021, a bag weighed down with an anchor containing the remains of Olivia, the eldest of the daughters, appeared 1,000 m (3,300 ft) deep on the seabed, and three miles from the coast. Her body was found off the coast of the island's capital, Santa Cruz de Tenerife, near the Auditorio de Tenerife.

After the discovery, her body was transferred to the Forensic Anatomical Institute of Tenerife for an autopsy. The following day, it was revealed that fingerprint tests had confirmed that it was Olivia's body.

Upon the discovery of Olivia's body, Beatriz Zimmermann expressed her desire to remove the paternal surname from her daughters' names, thus erasing any link that may refer to it, leaving their names as Olivia and Anna Zimmermann de Zárate. On 13 June, Beatriz published a letter of thanks for the support received.

== Reactions ==
The case was the subject of great media coverage that transcended the borders of Spain. Newscasts and newspapers from various countries in Latin America, the United Kingdom, Italy, Portugal, Germany, and Australia echoed the case.

=== Politics ===
Several politicians and ministers expressed their condolences to the girls' mother, including: the Prime Minister of Spain, Pedro Sánchez; the Minister of Equality, Irene Montero; the president of the People's Party, Pablo Casado; the President of the Canary Islands, Ángel Víctor Torres; and the president of Citizens, Inés Arrimadas, among others.

Queen Letizia of Spain expressed her condemnation the day after the discovery of Olivia's body, during the closing of the Santander Womennow 2021 forum.

=== Culture, music, and sport ===
Through social media, various personalities from the world of culture, music and sports expressed their condemnation of the event, such as Paz Vega, Alejandro Sanz, Pastora Soler, Rudy Fernández, María Castro, Santiago Segura, Antonio Banderas, Marta Sánchez, Blas Cantó, Carlos Baute, Edurne, Malú, Rozalén, Álex García, Sergio Rodríguez, Raquel del Rosario, and Paula Echevarría, among others.

=== Public opinion ===
As a result of the discovery of Olivia's body, demonstrations, rallies, a minute of silence, and public acts condemning the act were called in most Spanish municipalities, standing out in large cities and provincial capitals, such as Madrid, Barcelona, Valencia, Granada, Toledo, Murcia, Cartagena, Lorca, Palma de Mallorca, Seville, Málaga, San Sebastián, Valladolid, Santiago de Compostela, Bilbao, Salamanca, and Santa Cruz de Tenerife itself, on whose coasts appeared the corpse of the oldest of the sisters, among other cities.

== Tribute ==
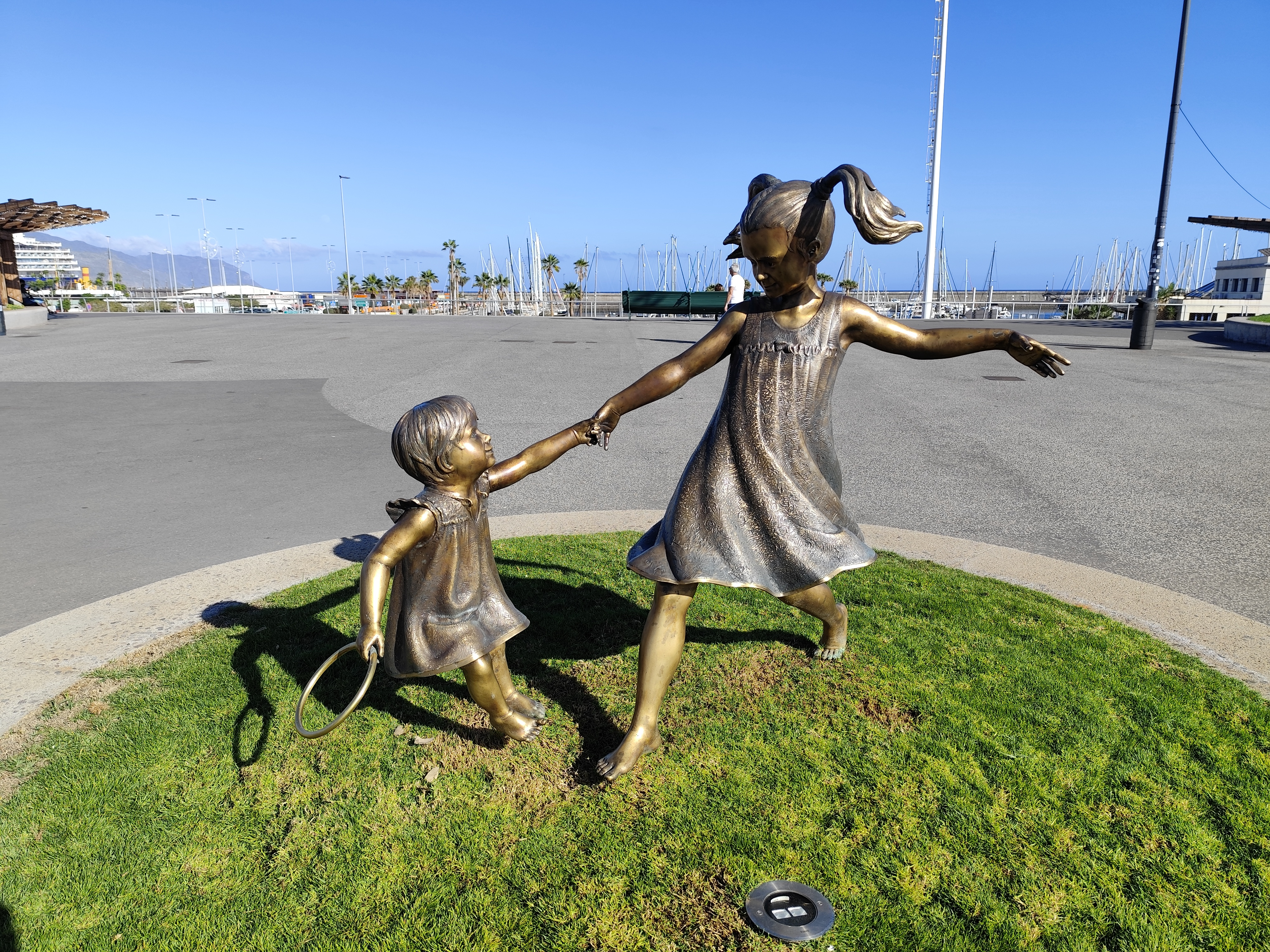
Sculpture in memory of Anna and Olivia located in Santa Cruz de Tenerife

On 18 October 2022, a bronze statue was inaugurated in homage to Anna and Olivia, located in the La Gesta of 25 July children's park, next to the Plaza de España in the city of Santa Cruz de Tenerife. The work of the Basque-born sculptor based in Tenerife, Julio Nieto, the work, in the words of the author, "is a soft design that reminds us of Anna and Olivia, their happy life, that tender look between them, of complicity and trust". The sculpture was donated by the Fundación Diario de Avisos. During the inauguration, the mother of the girls Beatriz Zimmermann and different political authorities were present.

== See also ==
- José Bretón case
- List of fugitives from justice who disappeared
- List of kidnappings
- List of solved missing person cases (post-2000)
