= The Asunta Case =

Spanish crime thriller miniseries

- Release poster
- Spanish: El caso Asunta
- Created by: Ramón Campos; Gema R. Neira; Jon de la Cuesta; David Orea Arribas
- Written by: Ramón Campos
- Directed by: Carlos Sedes; Jacobo Martínez
- Starring: Candela Peña; Tristán Ulloa; Javier Gutiérrez; Carlos Blanco; María León; Francesc Orella; Alicia Borrachero; Iris Wu
- Country of origin: Spain
- Original languages: Spanish and Galician
- No. of episodes: 6

Production
- Production company: Bambú Producciones

Original release
- Network: Netflix
- Release: 26 April 2024

The Asunta Case (Spanish: El caso Asunta) is a 2024 Spanish crime thriller miniseries based on the murder of Asunta Basterra, starring Candela Peña and Tristán Ulloa.

== Premise ==
The series centers around the investigation concerning the Asunta Basterra case, after Asunta's parents Rosario Porto and Alfonso Basterra reported her missing on 21 September 2013 and her corpse was subsequently found on a road near Santiago de Compostela.

== Cast ==
- Candela Peña as Rosario Porto
- Tristán Ulloa as Alfonso Basterra
- Iris Wu as Asunta
- Javier Gutiérrez as Judge Malvar
- Carlos Blanco as Agent Ríos
- María León as Cristina Cruces
- Francesc Orella
- Alicia Borrachero
- Raúl Arévalo
- Ricardo de Barreiro

== Production ==
=== Development ===
After the broadcast of the documentary "The Asunta Case (Operation Water Lily)", series producer Ramón Campos received many new testimonies from people who had not wanted to talk before because they feared that the documentary could fall into yellow journalism. Those people who provided new testimonies and a lot of information did not want to appear on camera and that led him to propose a fictionalized series.

As he has stated, "he is not interested in crime for crime's sake", but in being able to talk about and reflect on society. One of the themes addressed in the series is parenthood, so the secondary characters show different aspects of paternal-filial relationships: the father with Alzheimer's disease, the grandfather who plays the role of father, the difficulties in getting pregnant.

Another issue is the danger of the media, the unclear relationship between press and justice, and the right to a fair trial. Campos has stated that the series talks a lot "about the communicating vessels between justice and the press and how dangerous that can be". In his opinion, the parents "had no opportunity to defend themselves". Tristán Ulloa has also stated that Alfonso Basterra arrived at the trial being considered by all to be a pedophile although there was no evidence to prove it, and that the parents entered the courtroom already sentenced because of the intense trial by media.

The series is a Bambú Producciones production created by Ramón Campos, Gema R. Neira, Jon de la Cuesta, and David Orea Arribas. Carlos Sedes and Jacobo Martínez directed the six-episode miniseries.

=== Casting ===
Javier Gutiérrez was the first known actor to join the project. Candela Peña had been called to play the role of an agent, but she asked to audition as Rosario Porto and managed to convince the producers. She worked with two coaches to improve on her Galician accent.

=== Filming ===
Shooting locations included Santiago de Compostela and Vigo. Many technicians on the production team were from Galicia and had previously worked at the series Fariña. The production team refused to shoot in Asunta's own apartment or in the country house where she was killed.

== Episodes ==
"21 September"

Rosario Porto and Alfonso Basterra are interviewed in the company of their adopted daughter Asunta, to talk about the adoption process in China. Years later, they go to the police station to report their daughter missing. Two revelers discover the corpse of a Chinese girl on a forest track. The judge appears at the removal of the corpse, enters the scene of the crime without putting on the white insulated suit. They see some orange ropes near the corpse. Two Civil Guard officers go to the parents' home to report. The Civil Guard Ríos decides to visit the mother's country house and there he discovers in a trash can some orange ropes like the ones found next to the corpse. The people in charge of the case have breakfast after a long night and the investigating judge gives an irrelevant piece of information to a journalist. The Guardia Civil Cruces has trouble getting pregnant. The judge goes to the place of the autopsy. At the cremation of her daughter, Rosario observes how beautiful everything is and begins to take photographs, Alfonso imitates her. A security camera footage from a gas station shows that Rosario had not left the girl at home as she had told police. Rosario is arrested just after the cremation ceremony.

"24 September"

Rosario enters the dungeons. Judge Malvar has problems with his father, who has Alzheimer's. At the funeral for Asunta, Alfonso Basterra feels the burden of being a suspect. In the cells, Rosario suffers an anxiety attack and is taken to the terrace to get some fresh air, where she opens up to the Civil Guard and talks about her lover Vicente. The Civil Guard Cruces tells her about the images of the girl in the car and she changes her story immediately. In a nine-month jump back, Alfonso reads the emails on his wife's computer and discovers the infidelity. The judge receives toxicology reports indicating that Asunta was heavily drugged at the time of asphyxiation. The couple of civil guards search the hardware stores for orange ropes like the ones that appeared next to the body. A music teacher witnesses Asunta's drowsiness months ago. The Civil Guard interrogates Rosario's lover, who is arrogant. The neighbor closest to the place where the girl's body was found assures the Civil Guards that he passed by that night and did not see the body. Journalists harass Alfonso as it jumps back to the moment of the breakup between Alfonso and Rosario when the latter blames him for his infidelity. A search of Teo's house ensues. Alfonso reacts violently when the judge touches a photo of Asunta and the judge provokes him. Alfonso is arrested.

"26 September"

After his divorce, Alfonso goes to Bilbao to ask his family for help. Back in the present day, Rosario and Alfonso's apartments are searched, neighbors and strangers crowd the street to rebuke and threaten them. The prosecutor discusses with the judge the strength of the arguments for ordering Alfonso's pre-trial detention. The conversations between Rosario and Alfonso in the cells are recorded. In a new flashback, we see that Rosario's lover does not want to commit to her after the divorce, which causes a strong crisis for Rosario.

"28 September"

Rosario's new lawyer discovers that a man tried to kill Asunta on the night of July 4 at Rosario's home, but she did not report it to the police. Traces of DNA found on the T-shirt worn by Asunta point to Carlos Murillo, a Guatemalan living in Madrid, but he has a solid alibi and it all seems to be due to an inexplicable error by the central laboratory of the Guardia Civil.

"24 hours"

Agent Ríos verifies that a woman can drag a sack of Asunta's weight and goes before the judge to tell him his interpretation of the facts: Rosario returned to her lover, argued with Alfonso, who told him that she could never get rid of him because she needed him to take care of Asunta; Rosario prepares an overdose of lorazepam and dissolves it in orange juice but gives it to Asunta when she asks for something to drink; she takes her to the cottage, drowns her with a cushion, and then leaves the corpse on a dark track; when she talks to Alfonso and tells him that the girl is gone, Alfonso decides to help her pretend that it wasn't her. The judge responds with his own interpretation: Alfonso has discovered some secret that could sink them and decides to kill Asunta; Rosario can't object. When Asunta is taken to the scene of the crime, Alfonso crouches in the back of the car so as not to be seen by any cameras; Between the two of them, they squeeze the cushion over the girl's face. To corroborate the judge's vision, Laura, a fifteen-year-old classmate of Asunta's, appears, who claims to have seen Alfonso and Asunta walking down the street on the afternoon of the crime.

"The trial"

Agent Ríos points out that one of the cameras reviewed after the crime shows that Laura was indeed in that area that afternoon, but she could not see Asunta, because the time of the recording is after the moment when Asunta drives away with her mother. Judge Malvar responds that this is a time interval subject to interpretation, if the defenses find it and consider that it can be useful to them, they are within their rights, but it does not seem easy for the lawyers to find that photo. The jury is chosen and the trial begins. It is very difficult to find a jury who has not seen or heard the most lurid facts through the most sensationalist programs and press. At the trial, some points of the case are discussed: the orange ropes, the reliability of the testimony of the witness. One of the jurors has doubts about Alfonso Basterra's guilt, but the other jurors remind him of the conversations recorded in the cells between the parents. A phrase that was not said and invented by the press: "You didn't have time to get rid of that, did you?" convinces the hesitant witness that he must vote for Basterra's guilt. Both parents are sentenced to 18 years in prison. Rosario's final request to her lawyer was an obituary for her daughter printed every September 22nd that reads, "I will always love you. - Mom" A final scene shows Rosario, Alfonso, and Asunta vacationing in Paris in its heyday. The father takes a picture of his wife and daughter resting in bed. Rosario looks up from the magazine she is reading and smiles.

== Release ==
The Asunta Case was released on Netflix on 26 April 2024.

== Reception ==
=== Critical response ===
Raquel Hernández Luján of HobbyConsolas rated The Asunta Case with 80 points ('very good'), highlighting the chilling performance delivered by Candela Peña as the best thing about the series. Álvaro De Luna of Esquire cited the cast performances as the truly remarkable thing about the series, including Peña, Ulloa, Gutiérrez and Borrachero's. Álvaro Onieva of Fotogramas rated the series 7 out of 10 points, deeming it to be "well-produced, directed and acted fiction, [as well as] formally sober and well-paced", but also wondering if the true crime "justifies its existence" bringing something to the table other than a commercial justification.

=== Accolades ===
Year	Award	Category	Nominee(s)	Result	Ref.
2024	30th Forqué Awards	Best Series		Nominated	
2024	30th Forqué Awards	Best Actress in a Series	Candela Peña	Nominated	
2025	26th Iris Awards	Best Fiction		Won	
2025	26th Iris Awards	Best Production – Fiction	Ramón Campos	Won	
2025	26th Iris Awards	Best Direction – Fiction	Carlos Sedes, Jacobo Martínez	Won	
2025	26th Iris Awards	Best Screenplay – Fiction	Ramón Campos, Gema R. Neira, David Orea, Jon de la Cuesta, Javier Chacártegui	Nominated	
2025	26th Iris Awards	Best Actress	Candela Peña	Won	
2025	12th Feroz Awards	Best Main Actress in a Series	Candela Peña	Nominated	
2025	12th Feroz Awards	Best Main Actor in a Series	Tristán Ulloa	Nominated	
2025	12th Feroz Awards	Best Supporting Actress in a Series	María León	Nominated	
2025	12th Feroz Awards	Best Supporting Actor in a Series	Javier Gutiérrez	Nominated	
2025	33rd Actors and Actresses Union Awards	Best Television Actress in a Leading Role	Candela Peña	Won	
2025	33rd Actors and Actresses Union Awards	Best Television Actor in a Leading Role	Tristán Ulloa	Nominated	
2025	33rd Actors and Actresses Union Awards	Best Television Actor in a Secondary Role	Javier Gutiérrez	Nominated	
2025	33rd Actors and Actresses Union Awards	Best Television Actress in a Minor Role	Alicia Borrachero	Nominated	

== See also ==
- 2024 in Spanish television
