= La Voz de Galicia =

Spanish daily newspaper

- Type: Daily newspaper
- Format: Berliner
- Owner: Fundación Santiago Rey Fernández-Latorre
- Founder: Juan Fernández Latorre
- Editor-in-chief: Rubén Santamarta Vicente
- Editor: Lois Blanco Penas
- Founded: 4 January 1882
- Language: Spanish, Galician
- Headquarters: A Coruña, Galicia
- Website: www.lavozdegalicia.es

La Voz de Galicia (lit. 'The Voice of Galicia') is the third-largest general-interest newspaper in Spain, with a nationwide audience of 395,000, according to data from the second wave of the 2024 General Media Study. In Galicia, it is the leading publication, holding a 63% market share. Its digital edition is the leading news website in the region. It is written primarily in Spanish with Galician used in the cultural and opinion sections.

Founded in 1882, it is the parent company of the first Galician multimedia group, Corporación Voz de Galicia, with a presence in all fields of communication. In addition to La Voz de Galicia, it also includes RadioVoz, Voz Audiovisual, Sondaxe, La Voz de Asturias, Canal Voz, Galicia Editorial and Distribuidora Gallega de Publicaciones.

In early 2019, the newspaper undertook a profound reorganization, fully integrating its print and digital editions to adapt to the changing media landscape and to support the paid content model launched in April of that year.

On 28 August 2024, Santiago Rey Fernández-Latorre, owner and editor of La Voz de Galicia, died. According to his will, the Santiago Rey Fernández-Latorre Foundation inherits La Voz de Galicia and other companies that form Corporación Voz de Galicia and Lois Blanco Penas is appointed president of the Foundation. In October 2024 the succession process is completed with the appointment of Lois Blanco as president of Corporación La Voz de Galicia. Santiago Rey Fernández-Latorre is honorary editor of the newspaper.

== Editions ==
The newspaper publishes thirteen daily editions, produced from twenty-six locations (branches, sub-branches, and correspondent offices). Each edition features a dedicated local insert containing all regional information, a front page specific to each region, and specific news from each area in the main section of the newspaper, especially in the sports section.

La Voz de Galicia created its first branch outside A Coruña in 1953, with the opening of the Ferrol office. In 1959, Santiago de Compostela; in 1964, Carballo, and so on until 1978, when the seven main Galician cities had local editorial offices. By 1990, the main regions were also covered, and shortly after, the Madrid editorial office was opened.

The regional editions of La Voz de Galicia are named as follows:

- A Coruña: La Voz de A Coruña
- Arousa: La Voz de Arousa
- Barbanza: La Voz de Barbanza
- Bergantiños: La Voz de Bergantiños
- Deza: La Voz de Deza-Tabeirós
- Ferrol: La Voz de Ferrol
- Lugo: La Voz de Lugo
- A Mariña: La Voz de A Mariña
- Monforte de Lemos: La Voz de Lemos
- Ourense: La Voz de Ourense
- Pontevedra: La Voz de Pontevedra
- Santiago de Compostela: La Voz de Santiago
- Vigo: La Voz de Vigo

== Digital edition ==
Coinciding with the celebration of Día das Letras Galegas (Galician Literature Day) in honor of the writer Manuel Murguía, La Voz de Galicia website was launched on 17 May 2000. It is the most visited website in Galicia.

In 2015, lavozdegalicia.es expanded its commitment to local journalism with the creation of 313 hyperlocal websites, offering news and service information from every municipality in Galicia. In May 2016, the outlet strengthened its audiovisual production capabilities by expanding its video editing team, which in just a few months increased its video audience from 200,000 monthly views to more than two million.

Since January 2019, La Voz de Galicia has integrated its digital and print editions into a single newsroom that produces content for both platforms and has launched a paywall model for digital content.
