= Murder of Gabriel Cruz =

2018 murder of a child in Spain

Gabriel Cruz Ramírez
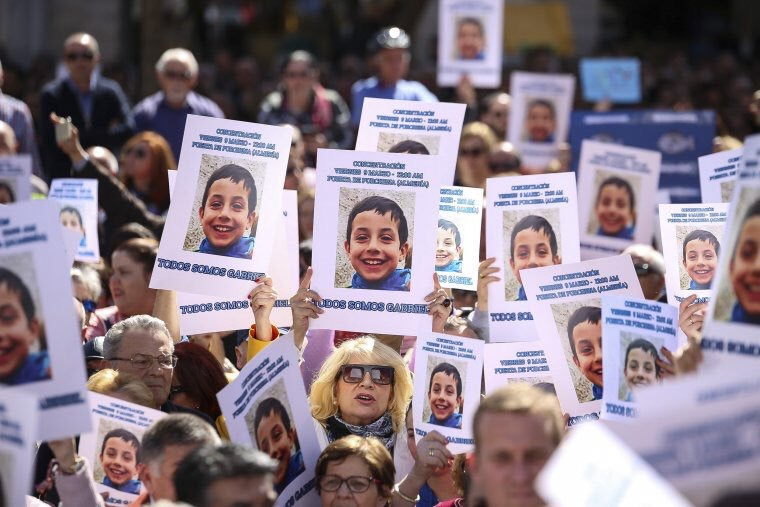
- Born: Almería, Andalusia, Spain
- Died: 27 February 2018 (aged 8); Níjar, Andalusia, Spain
- Cause of death: Murder
- Other name: Pececillo or Pescaíto

The murder of Gabriel Cruz, also known as Operación Nemo, refers to the events related to the disappearance of Gabriel Cruz Ramírez, aged 8, on the afternoon of 27 February 2018 in Almería, Andalusia, Spain.

Cruz disappeared while travelling from his grandmother's residence to his cousins', only 100 metres (330 ft) away, and remained missing for twelve days. A search and rescue operation consisting of over 5,000 people, including 3,000 volunteers and 2,000 professionals, was established. It was the largest coordinated search for a missing person in Spanish history.

On 11 March 2018, Cruz's body was found in the boot of a vehicle belonging to Ana Julia Quezada, who was his father's partner at the time. Quezada had killed and buried Cruz on a farm owned by his father's family in the town of Rodalquilar, and had dug up and transported the body to her home in La Puebla de Vícar when she was detained by the Civil Guard. She confessed to the crime two days later.

In September 2019, Ana Julia Quezada was found guilty of murder.

== Context ==
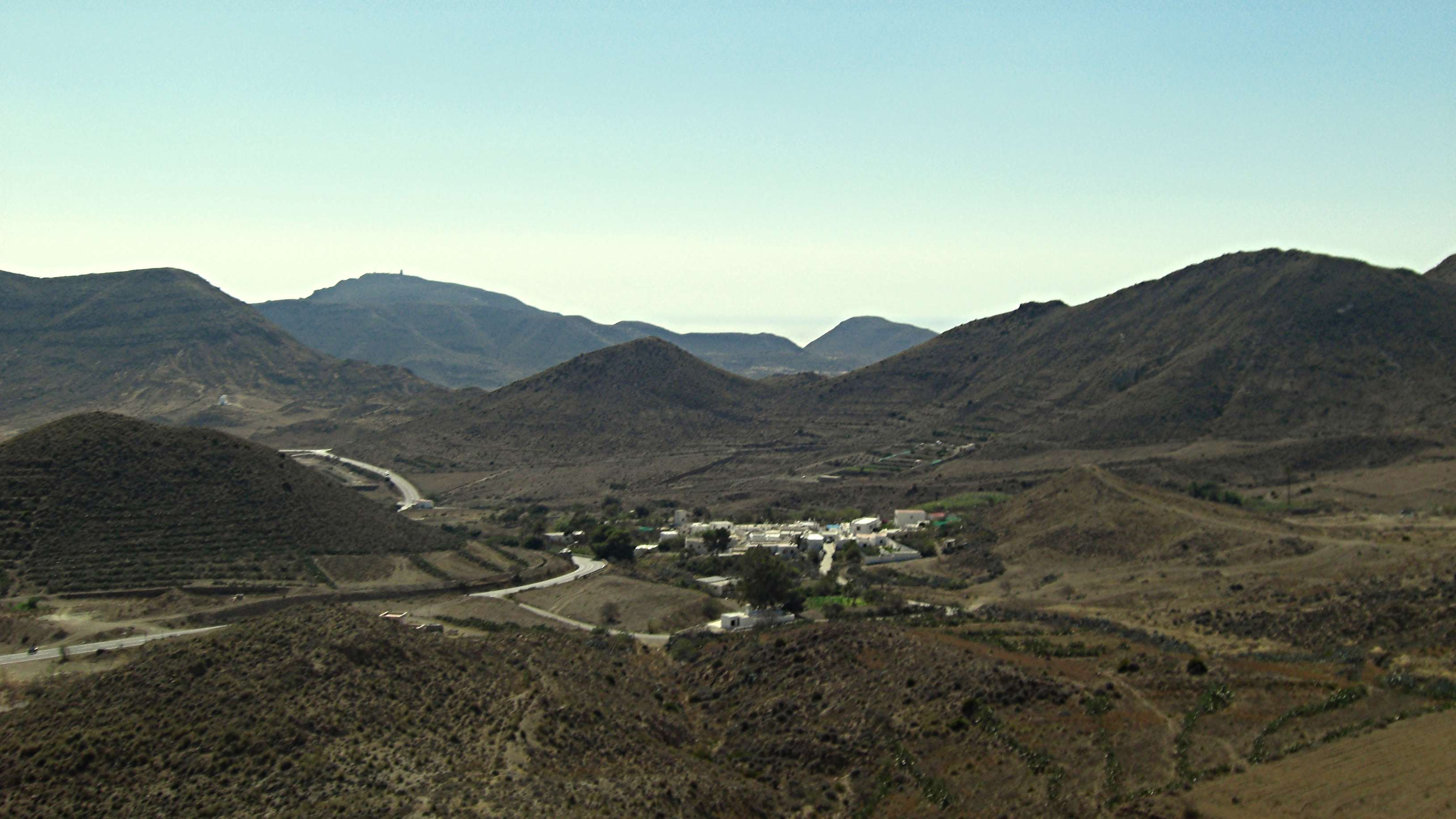
Panoramic photography of Las Hortichuelas, one of the three crime scenes.

In February 2018, Gabriel Cruz was living with his grandmother in the town of Las Hortichuelas, located in the heart of the Cabo de Gata-Níjar Natural Park in Almería, Andalusia, Spain. On 27 February, at 3.30pm, Cruz left his grandmother's house to go play at his cousins' house, which was located 100 metres (330 ft) away. Walking to his cousins' house required travelling through an unpaved dirt road and crossing the main street, but Cruz disappeared before reaching his destination. When Cruz failed to return at 6.00 pm, his grandmother went to the relatives' house and discovered he had never visited. Neighbours started to look for Cruz as his parents, who were not in town at the time, were alerted; they quickly joined in the search for their son. Five hours later, at 8.30 pm, Cruz's family contacted police.

Almost one week later, a white t-shirt was found about 4 km (2.5 mi) from the place where Cruz was last seen. Minister of Home Affairs Juan Ignacio Zoido confirmed that the analyses carried out by the forensics laboratory of the Civil Guard found traces of Cruz's DNA on the shirt. Investigators later determined that the discovery of the shirt was feigned by Cruz's alleged murderer. The fact that the clothing was almost dry when discovered in spite of previous rain was deemed a clue.

On 9 March 2018, Spanish media reported that two people claimed to have seen a van lurking near the path Cruz was presumed to have taken. Only two days later, Cruz's body was located inside another vehicle — owned by Ana Julia Quezada, his father’s girlfriend.

== Search operation ==
While Cruz had disappeared somewhere along the short distance between his grandmother’s house and his cousins’, the Civil Guard spread their search area over 6 km (3.7 mi) from the starting point, and then up to 12 km (7.5 mi) around specific areas such as wells, old mines or uninhabited houses.

The agents focused on Las Negras waterworks, near the place where Quezada pretended to find Cruz' t-shirt. A specialised team of divers searched for the child at more than 500 points, including wells and cisterns. The investigation was impeded by the lack of road or security cameras in Las Hortichuelas, where there are hardly any businesses that would require them.

== Perpetrator ==
Ana Julia Quezada was the romantic partner of Gabriel Cruz's father, Ángel David Cruz. Originally from the Dominican Republic, Quezada emigrated to Spain with her daughter, Ridelca Josefina Gil Quezada, in 1995.

The following year Ridelca, aged 4, fell through a seventh-floor window at her mother's residence in Burgos. The incident was ruled an accidental death, but authorities announced that it would be reinvestigated after Gabriel Cruz's murder.

Quezada actively participated in Gabriel's search and she seemed sad for what had happened. She spoke with the media, cried, and comforted her partner. The Civil Guard revealed that she was giving Angel large doses of diazepam (an anxiolytic) to calm him and make him forget about what had happened. She had also tried to persuade him to go to Dominican Republic for weeks, but he refused. “Don't worry, Angel. When we find Gabrielito and once this is over, we’ll get married”, she told him repeatedly.

Although she initially stated that she was not guilty, Quezada confessed to the crime two days later. She was charged with murder, kidnapping, and crimes against moral integrity.

During her first court appearance, Quezada repeated the declaration made before the Civil Guard, in which she admitted to fatally suffocating Cruz following an argument. She then allegedly hid his body in the family's cottage in Rodalquilar, where the child had been taken after being kidnapped. This version was partially discredited by the investigators in their official account of the facts:

The defendant...killed him the day of his abduction, suffocating him, and buried him by covering him with decorative stones and planks.

As the Lieutenant Colonel, Accidental Chief of the Civil Guard Command of Almeria, José Hernández Mosquera, stated a posteriori, Quezada was suspected practically from the beginning of the investigation. Even so, the agents always believed she had Gabriel alive; their goal was to get her to take them to the boy. But an autopsy revealed he was killed the same day he disappeared.

On March 3, an essential event occurred that would later help to solve the case: she staged the appearance of the t-shirt worn by the boy. She claimed she found it about 4 km (2.5 mi) from Las Hortichuelas. Discovering the shirt would require her to go through a piece of land, arrive in Las Negras and enter a gully, something that was considered implausible by authorities. She had suggested to the boy's father he should search the area.

According to the Civil Guard, the t-shirt was a sign that the defendant wanted to give the father hope. A former partner of hers resided near the site, so in all likelihood, she thought that researchers would direct their inquests towards that person, but it proved to be unsuccessful.

On March 11, Ana Julia went to Rodalquiar house, while she was under close surveillance. The officers saw her pulling some planks and stones out the garden, as well as a small body. She put it in her vehicle's trunk and drove through Almería and arrived in Vícar. Authorities arrested her when she exited the car, looking in the trunk and finding Gabriel’s body wrapped in a blanket. The body was in good condition, dressed only in underwear.

In jail, her statement was taken, and she confessed in front of her lawyer that she was responsible for the killing, giving some details such as the fact that she had thrown Gabriel’s clothes in a glass container in the town Retamar. The agents examined the area and found them, except for the t-shirt.

== Impact ==
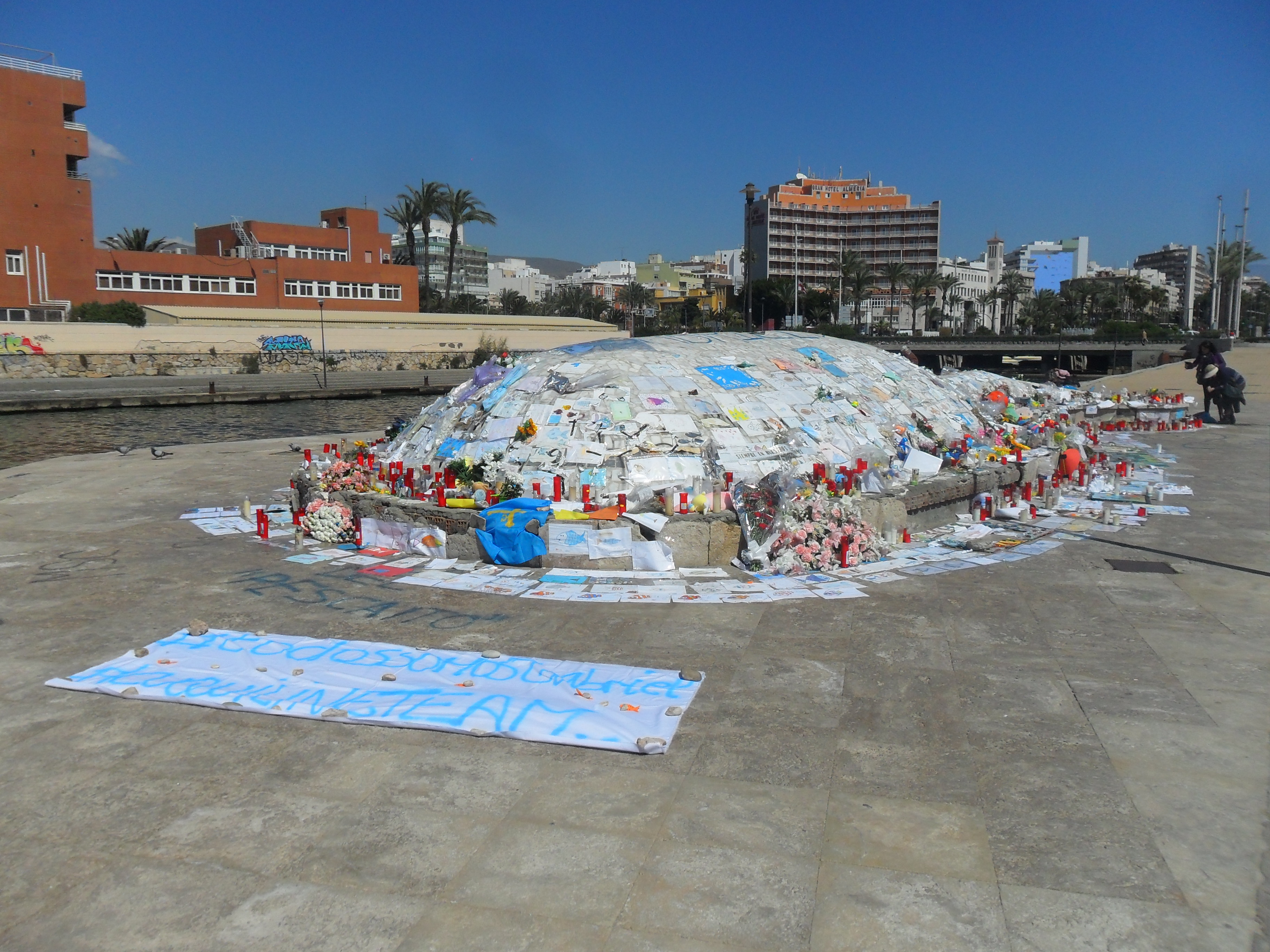
Almeria paying homage to Gabriel.

Gabriel Cruz’s case shocked the Spanish society. Two days before the body was found, a demonstration was held in Almería to encourage the child’s return. His parents said that Gabriel loved fish, that he liked drawing them and that he wanted to become a marine biologist. Subsequently, the symbol of a small fish filled windows, schools, public centres and social networks all over the country so as to support them.

== See also ==
- List of solved missing person cases (post-2000)
- Murders of Anna and Olivia Zimmerman
