= José Bretón case =

2011 murders in Córdoba, Andalusia, Spain

José Bretón Case
- Court: Audiencia Provincial of Córdoba
- Decided: 22 July 2013

Case opinions
- Decision by: Jury Sentence (Sentencia del Tribunal del Jurado 1/2013, 56/2012)

Keywords
- murder, simulation of kidnapping

The José Bretón case or the Ruth and José case is the name given to the events related to the disappearance and death of the siblings Ruth Bretón Ortiz, 6, and José Bretón Ortiz, 2, on 8 October 2011, in the city of Córdoba, Spain. Both were killed by their father, José Bretón Gómez, who burnt their corpses without leaving any identifiable remains of the children.

The case received a level of high media coverage, because the National Police's leading research official categorically denied after examination of the burnt remains that they could be human, classifying them as "rodent bones". Anthropologist Francisco Etxeberria offered his assistance to Ruth Ortiz's accusation lawyer, disputing the previous conclusions and revealing the human nature of the remains.

On 22 July 2013 the Audiencia Provincial of Córdoba sentenced José Bretón to 40 years in prison for double murder. The kinship, the premeditation and the cruel character demonstrated by Bretón were aggravating circumstances. In March 2015 the sentence was reduced to a maximum of 25 years.

== Context ==
In September 2011, Ruth Ortiz Ramos told her husband, José Bretón Gómez, with whom she had two children, Ruth and José, 6 and 2 years old respectively, about her intention to divorce him; José Bretón conceived the idea of murdering their children as a revenge against his wife.

Bretón committed the crime on 8 October 2011, having picked his children up the day before to take to Cordoba to spend the weekend.

== Planning the murder ==
In order to carry out his plan, José Bretón decided that the most appropriate place would be the estate of his parents, known as Finca de Las Quemadillas, in Córdoba. Also, he decided that the suitable date would be on 8 October 2011, because that weekend he would be with his children.

For that purpose, he started a series of preparations. Thus, a medical psychiatrist, who had already treated him three years before and with whom he had recently consulted, had prescribed him the drugs Orfidal, an anxiolytic and Motivan, an antidepressant. José Bretón bought these on 29 September 2011.

Between 5 and 7 October 2011, with the intent to make the corpses of his children disappear, José Bretón collected firewood and bought over 270 litres of diesel fuel in large quantities at a petrol station in Huelva.

At the same time, José Bretón came up with an alibi for the disappearance of his children and decided to pretend that he had lost them in a park. In order to be able to offer some information about the alleged disappearance, he carried out a kind of experiment with his nephews, the children of his sister Catalina Bretón and his brother-in-law José Ortega, on the morning of 6 October 2011, leaving them on their own for a few moments when he was taking them to school.

== Course of the events ==
On 7 October 2011, José Bretón picked up his children in Huelva and went with them to Córdoba. They first went to his parents’ house and then to his sister's house, where he left them. From there, he went to Las Quemadillas, his estate, to get the fuel he had bought that morning in Huelva out of his car's boot and leave it there.

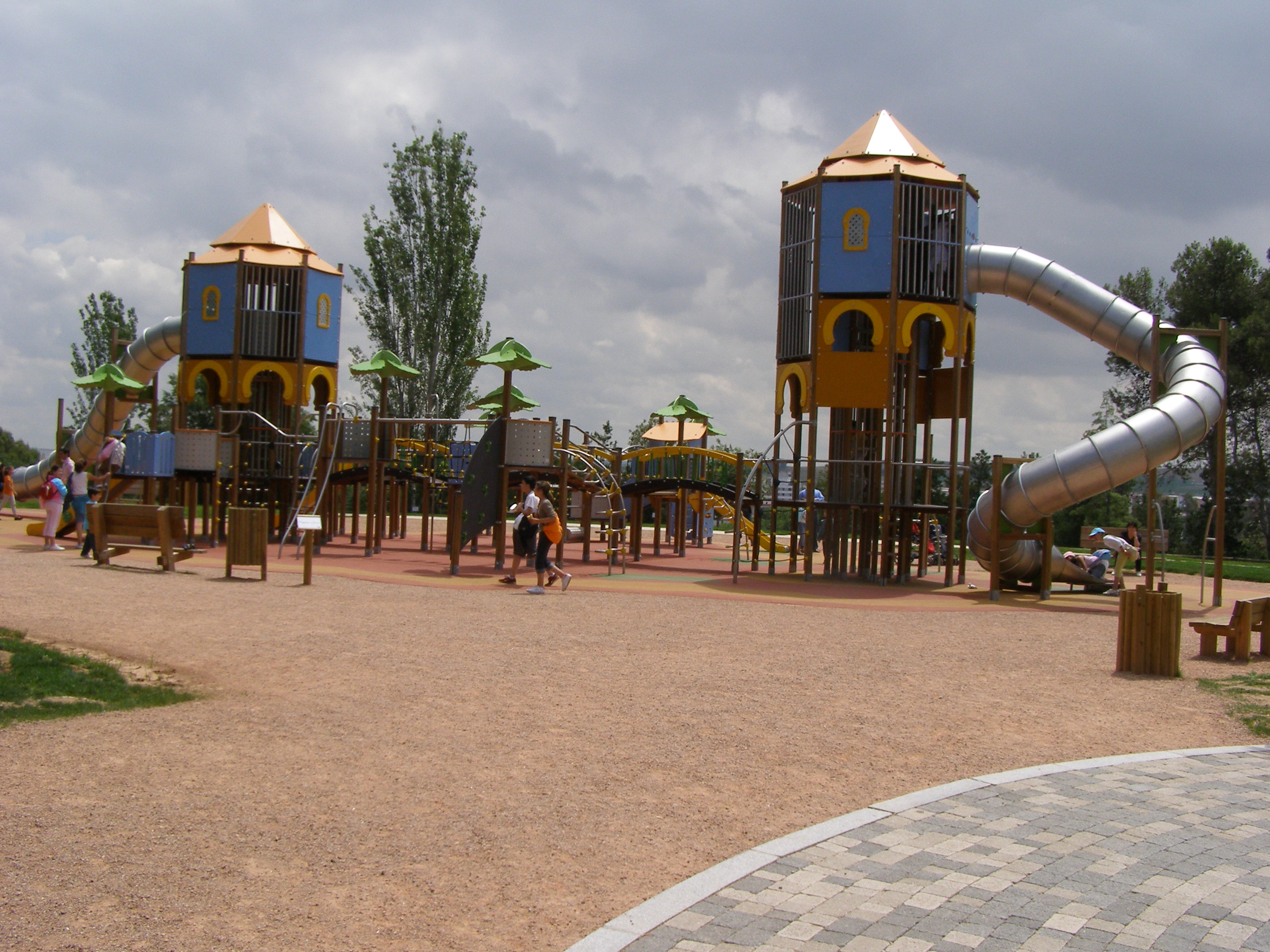
Córdoba's City of Children, the playground where José Bretón claimed to have lost his children.

In addition, Bretón suggested to his siblings to go in the afternoon of 8 October to the “City of Children” with their respective children in order to gain a better cover for the loss simulation of Ruth and José. However, they didn't agree on the appointment completely. He told his mother that he wouldn't be able to go to her house for lunch on that same day as he was going to meet some friends, which was untrue.

On the morning of 8 October, José Bretón and his children went to Catalina's house, where Bretón stayed with them and his nephews until 1:30 pm, while his sister and brother-in-law were doing some shopping. When they returned, José Bretón's brother-in-law took him and his children to the grandparents’ house to pick up his car. Once there, José Bretón stopped by just long enough to make his family believe he was going to have lunch with some friends, which was false.

When he left his parents’ house, José Bretón, along with his two children, drove to Las Quemadillas with his car. During the journey, or when he arrived at the estate, he supplied both Ruth and José with an undetermined number of the tranquillizers Motivan and Orfidal, in order to facilitate the children's total drowsiness and/or death. Once they arrived at the estate, at about 1:48 pm of that day, José Bretón phoned his wife again, without being able to contact her, so he decided to continue carrying out his purpose.

Afterwards, according to what he had already planned and meditated, he prepared a kind of funeral pyre. He had already arranged its essential elements in a new place of the estate, among several orange trees and without visibility from the outside. He laid his children down (it has been impossible to determine whether they were dead or alive), together with a metal table with the board upright, covering practically the whole length of the minors and the pyre itself, and set a large bonfire. He quickly stoked the bonfire with firewood – about 250 kilograms – and gasoil – about 80 liters –, which reached temperatures up to 1200 °C, achieving a similar effect to that of a crematorium. Given the magnitude of the temperature, the flesh of the children's bodies disappeared quickly, leaving only a few remains of bones. José Bretón remained by the stake until 5:30 pm, fueling it with diesel oil (an accelerant) in order to keep the temperature high enough to completely scorch and make his children's corpses disappear.

Right after, José Bretón drove to the neighbourhood of the City of Children. At 6:01 pm, he parked at about 300 meters distance. He texted his brother Rafael Bretón, making him believe that he was with his children near the park and then did the same with their mother, who called him from her house. When José Bretón thought that enough time had passed to make the fictional disappearance of his children credible, he called his brother Rafael at 6:18 pm, telling him that his children were lost. He made several phone calls to some relatives, thus making his brother and his brother-in-law go to the playground to start the search.

Around 6:41 pm, José Bretón called the Spanish emergency number 112 and notified the authorities of the disappearance of his children, provoking the intervention of the police. He went to the Córdoba police station at 8:43 pm to file a report of disappearance. Thereupon, the judicial proceeding started.

== Controversy over the bones ==
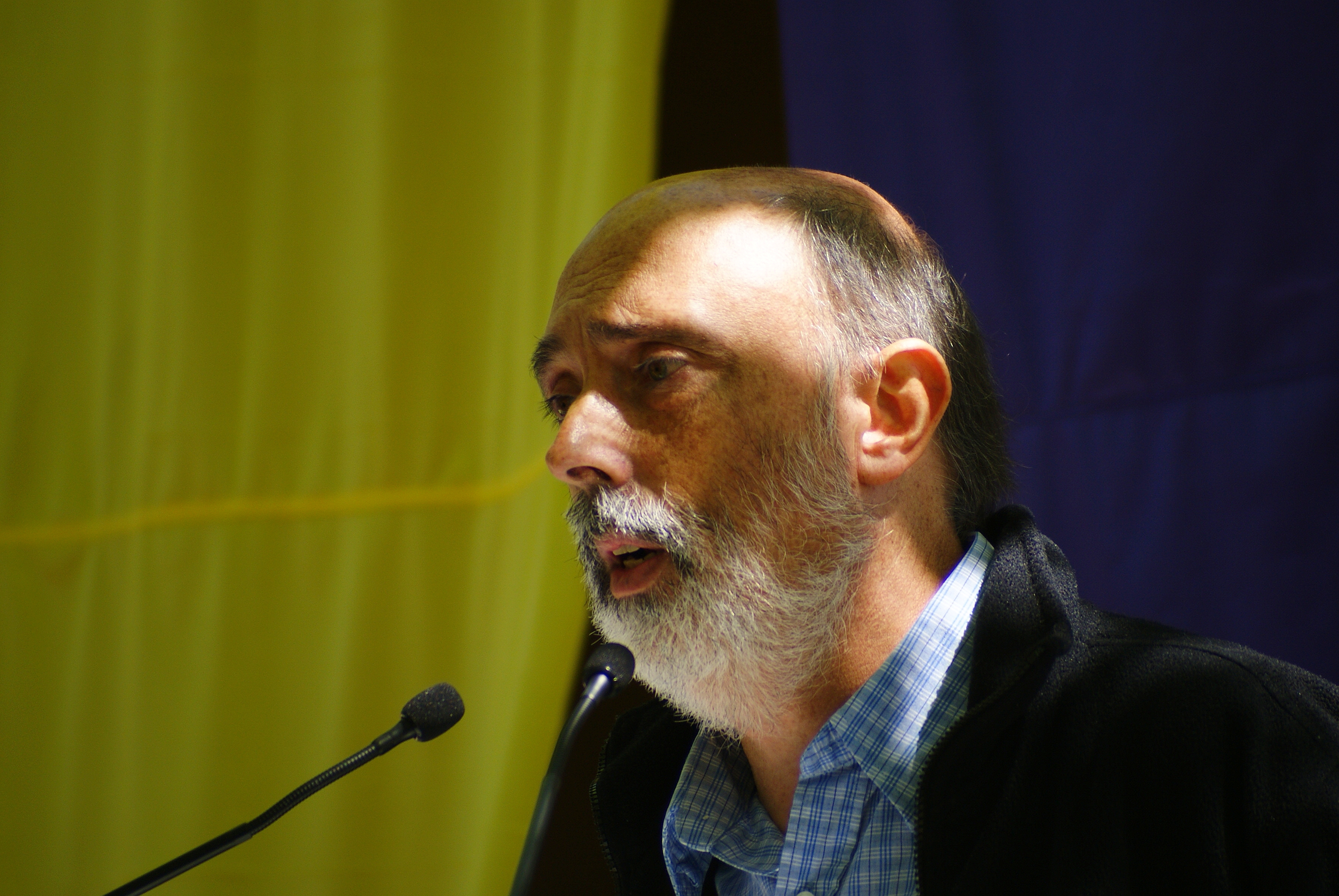
Francisco Etxeberria, anthropologist who made the second expert report on the remains found at Las Quemadillas at the request of Ruth Ortiz.

In one of the first reports of the judicial investigation, Josefina Lamas, the forensic anthropologist of the Scientific Police who analysed the remains of the bones found in the bonfire of Las Quemadillas, deduced that those bones corresponded to the remains of animals, specifically rodents and small carnivores. This report substantially delayed the resolution of the case. The mother of the children, Ruth Ortiz, requested a second expert report by the anthropologist Francisco Etxeberria, who revealed the existence of human bone fragments (which could correspond to 2- and 6-year-old children) in the remnants of the bonfire. A third analysis carried out by José María Bermúdez de Castro confirmed that the remains were human. As a result, Josefina Lamas was dismissed and the investigation concluded.

=== Chain of custody questioned ===
During the investigation of the case by the judge José Luis Rodríguez Lainz, some errors came to light in the chain of custody of the legal evidence related to the remains collected in the bonfire of Las Quemadillas. These remains were sent from Córdoba to Madrid for their study by the forensic anthropologists of the UDEV (Unit of Specialized and Violent Crimes). When Judge Rodríguez Lainz called to testify Josefina Lamas after the refutation of her preliminary report and her retraction, he proceeded to show different images of the evidence. Lamas declared the sample "number 8" missing in the photographs.

The hypothetical rupture of the chain of custody of the evidence was one of the fundamental lines of the defence of José Bretón in the trial. Serafín Castro, the chief commissioner of the UDEV at that time, stated at the trial that sample number 8 could have been, for its state, "disintegrated.”

== Trial ==
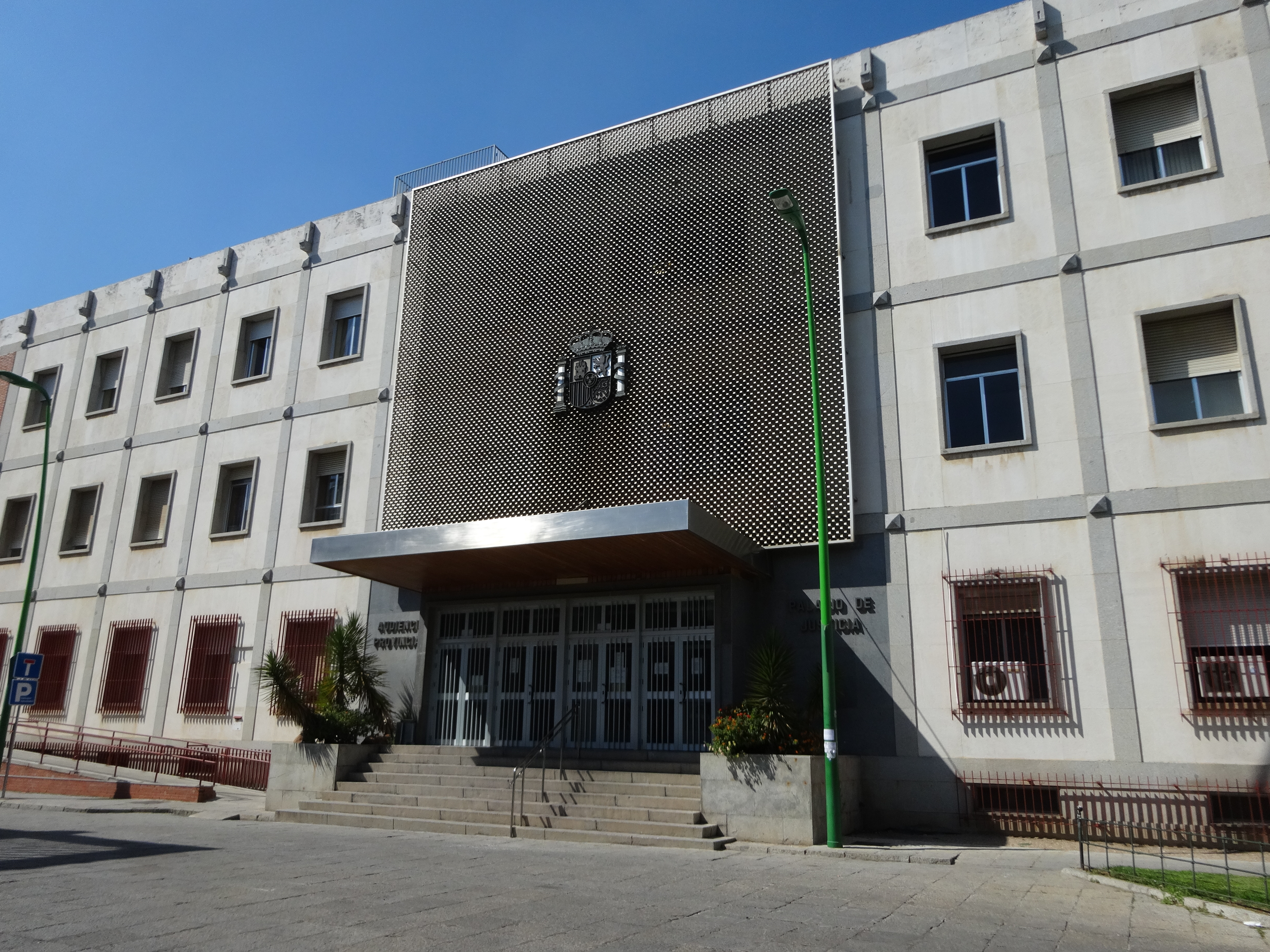
The judge José Luis Rodríguez Lainz of the Audiencia Provincial of Córdoba, in the image, instructed the case.

Bretón's trial began on 17 June 2013 in the Audiencia Provincial of Córdoba with the election of a public jury, consisting of seven women and four men. Bretón denied killing the children or supplying them with pills. Ruth Ortiz said in her statement that she decided to divorce Bretón because her life was unhappy. When Bretón informed her that the children had disappeared, she knew that she wouldn't see them again.

The petrol station workers from Huelva testified in court whereas Bretón's parents and siblings refused to testify. Bretón's brother-in-law claimed that while he did not think Bretón would have killed the children, Bretón was responsible for their vanishing. Some residents around Las Quemadillas stated that they had noticed an unpleasant burnt smell, but did not see any column of smoke. Ruth Ortiz's cousin, who had visited Bretón while he was in remand stated that Bretón had told him not once but three times that he had killed the children. Psychiatrists and psychologists who examined Bretón diagnosed that he did not suffer any mental disorder. Experts and medical examiner analysed the bone remains and indicated they were of human origin.

On 8 July, after the final reports were given by the Public Prosecution Service, the private prosecution and the defence, Bretón pleaded not guilty. On her behalf, the public prosecutor claimed that there was obvious evidence that proved that Bretón had murdered his children in the cruelest possible way and then burnt the corpses.

On 12 July the jury decided unanimously that Bretón was guilty and condemned him to 40 years of imprisonment (20 per murder).

== Appeals by the defence ==
Bretón's defence appealed the sentence from the Audiencia Provincial of Córdoba to the High Court of Justice of Andalucía, emphasising the chain of custody of the evidences. The High Court of Justice of Andalucía rejected the appeal in November 2013 and confirmed the 40 years of prison sentence imposed by the Audiencia Provincial of Córdoba.

The defence decided to bring an appeal to the Supreme Court of Spain, which rejected it unanimously in July 2014.

The Audiencia Provincial of Córdoba reduced the original sentence from 40 to 25 years of imprisonment by motion of the defence. Bretón was convicted for three different crimes (two murders and a simulation of kidnapping). Article 76 of the Spanish Criminal Code was applied. (Note: Article 76. 1. Notwithstanding the provisions of the article above, the maximum effective obedience from the conviction of the guilty party shall not exceed three times the time for which he is charged the most serious of the penalties in which he has incurred, declaring extinguished those that come as long as those already imposed cover that maximum, which will not exceed 20 years. As an exception, this maximum limit will be: a) 25 years, when the individual has been convicted for two or more crimes and one of them is penalised by law with a prison sentence of up to 20 years. b) 30 years, when the individual has been convicted for two or more crimes and one of them is penalised by law with a prison sentence of up to 20 years. c) 40 years, when the individual has been convicted for two or more crimes and at least two of them are penalised by law with a prison sentence of more than 20 years. d) 40 years, when the individual has been convicted for two or more crimes related to terrorist groups and organizations and terrorist crimes of Chapter VII of Title XXII of Book II of this Code and one of them is penalised by law with a prison sentence of up to 20 years. e) When the individual has been convicted for two or more crimes and, at least one of them is penalised by law with a permanent custodial sentence, action will be taken as set out in the articles 92 and 78. 2. The limitation is applied although the penalisations have been imposed in different processes when these events have taken place before the date in which they were sent to trial, which, as an object of accumulation, would have been in the first place.)

== See also ==
- Asunta Basterra case
- Anna and Olivia case
