= Feyer =

The surname Feyer may refer to:

- Johan Fredrik Feyer (1821 – 1880), a Norwegian industrial pioneer
- Dan Feyer, an American crossword puzzle solver
- A transliteration of the Hungarian surname Fejér:
  - George Feyer (born György Fejér), Canadian cartoonist
  - George Feyer (pianist) (born György Fejér)
- A transliteration of the Hungarian surname Fehér:
  - Thomas Feyer (born Fehér Tamás), journalist
