= Ross the Builder =

- Genre: Children's television
- Presented by: Ross Snetsinger
- Country of origin: Canada
- Original language: English
- No. of seasons: 1
- No. of episodes: 13

Production
- Producer: John Kennedy
- Running time: 15 minutes

Original release
- Network: CBC Television
- Release: 3 July – 23 September 1958

Ross the Builder is a Canadian children's television series that aired on CBC Television in 1958.

== Premise ==
This series was hosted by Ross Snetsinger with his puppet Foster. They demonstrated the construction of various items.

- 3 July 1958 - debut
- 10 July 1958 - guest magician Michael Roth
- 17 July 1958
- 24 July 1958 - constructing model cars, guest cartoonist George Feyer
- 31 July 1958 - constructing a telegraph, guest folk musician Jean Cavall
- 7 August 1958
- 14 August 1958 - constructing a model streetcar, also drawing demonstration with Foster, two other puppets and guest cartoonist George Feyer
- 21 August 1958 - plaster of Paris sculpting is demonstrated, guest folk-singer Jean Cavall
- 28 August 1958
- 4 September 1958 - using cardboard to construct toys; guest folk musician Jean Cavall
- 11 September 1958 - guest Jean Cavall
- 18 September 1958 - demonstration of sketching of life
- 25 September 1958 - guest folk musician Ed McCurdy

== Scheduling ==
This 15-minute series aired Thursdays 5 p.m. from 3 July to 25 September 1958.

Snetsinger and Foster joined the cast of Whistle Town which occupied the Thursday time slot from October 1958.
