= Life imprisonment in Spain =

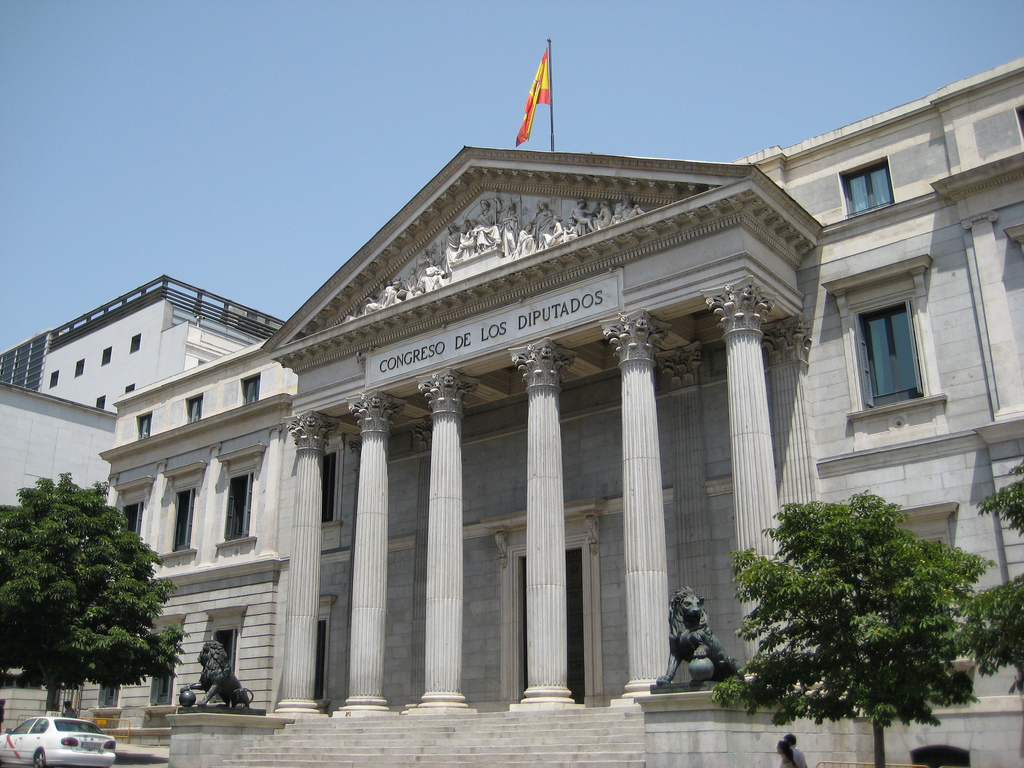
Congress of deputies

Life imprisonment in Spain was introduced by the Ley Orgánica 1/2015 in March 2015, effective from 1 July 2015. The sentence can be revised, so it is officially called "revisable permanent imprisonment" (Spanish: prisión permanente revisable).

== History ==
Life imprisonment had previously been introduced in 1822 as a life sentence of forced labour, and in 1848 was revised as life in prison. In 1870, this was reformed to allow the possibility of parole after 30 years; at this time all life prisoners were detained in North Africa or the Canary Islands.

In 1928, the military dictatorship of Miguel Primo de Rivera removed life imprisonment from the statute books, though the death penalty remained. Capital punishment was retained under Francisco Franco, and the maximum prison sentence was of 30 years. After the Spanish transition to democracy, the death penalty was abolished and the maximum prison sentence remained at 30 until November 2003, when the government of José María Aznar increased it to 40 years for convicted terrorists.

A legislation establishing life imprisonment was passed on 26 March 2015. All votes in favour came from the governing People's Party.

Voting results for Ley Orgánica 1/2015, de 30 de marzo in the Congress of Deputies
| Date | Voting | People's Party (Spain) | Spanish Socialist Workers' Party | United Left (Spain) | Union, Progress and Democracy | Convergence and Union | Amaiur | Basque Nationalist Party | Republican Left of Catalonia | Galician Nationalist Bloc | Canarian Coalition | Compromís | Geroa Bai | New Canaries | Total |
|---|---|---|---|---|---|---|---|---|---|---|---|---|---|---|---|
| 26 March 2015 Required simple majority | Yes | 181 | | | | | | | | | | | | | 181 / 350 |
| 26 March 2015 Required simple majority | No | | 99 | 11 | 3 | 11 | 4 | 3 | 2 | 1 | 1 | 1 | 1 | 1 | 138 / 350 |
| 26 March 2015 Required simple majority | Abstention | 2 | | | | | | | | | | | | | 2 / 350 |
| 26 March 2015 Required simple majority | Did not vote | 5 | 11 | | 2 | 5 | 2 | 2 | 1 | 1 | | | | | 29 / 350 |

Murders are punished with life imprisonment in the following cases:

- When the victim is under the age of 16;
- When the victim is particularly vulnerable;
- When the murder takes place with sexual offences;
- When the murderer is part of a criminal organisation;
- When it is a multiple murder;
- When the victim is the monarch, consort or heir to the throne;
- When the victim is a foreign head of state or diplomat;
- Cases of Terrorism;
- Cases of genocide or crimes against humanity.

Convicts must serve between 25 and 35 years of their sentence, depending on the severity of their crimes, before being eligible for parole.

After the adoption of the current statute in 2015, the Spanish Socialist Workers' Party (PSOE) challenged it at the Constitutional Court. In October 2021, by seven votes to three, life imprisonment was deemed constitutional.

== Cases ==
As of 2026, 58 people have been sentenced to a reviewable permanent prison sentence: 46 men and 12 women.

| # | Name | Age at offense | Location | Date of sentence | Crime | Status |
|---|---|---|---|---|---|---|
| 1 | David Oubel | 40 | Moraña | 6 July 2015 | Murder of his two minor daughters. | Serving time. First person sentenced to permanent revisable imprisonment. |
| 2 | Sergio Díaz | 22 | Icod de los Vinos | 23 March 2018 | Murder of his partner's disabled grandfather, stabbing him and beating him with a marble statue. | Serving time. In January 2019, the Supreme Court quashed the sentence on a technicality due to the way in which the victim's disability was handled as an aggravating factor, and Díaz was instead sentenced to 24 years in prison. |
| 3 | Daniel Montaño | N/A | Vitoria-Gasteiz | 26 September 2018 | Murder of a 17-month-old girl. | Serving time. |
| 4 | Marcos Miras | 42 | A Coruña | 17 October 2018 | Murder of his 11-year-old son. | Serving time. First conviction by a jury. |
| 5 | Patrick Nogueira | 19 | Pioz | 15 November 2018 | Murder of his uncle, his aunt and his two infant cousins. | Serving time. First non-Spanish person to be sentenced to permanent revisable prison. |
| 6 | Pablo Catalán | 42 | Castellar del Vallès | 7 March 2019 | Murder and rape of a 44-year-old woman. | Serving time. |
| 7 | Francisco Salvador | 31 | Huércal de Almería | 7 April 2019 | Murder and rape of his 34-year-old partner. | Serving time. |
| 8 | Enrique Romay Reina | 33 | Pilas | 24 April 2019 | Rape attempt and murder of a 50-year-old woman. | Serving time. |
| 9 | José Rafael García Santana | 38 | Mora | 8 May 2019 | Murder of his disabled 40-year-old wife. | Serving time. The sentence was annulled due to a lack of substantiation by the jury. In September 2020, a new trial sentenced García Santana to 23 years in prison. |
| 10 | Roberto Hernández | N/A | Valladolid | 5 June 2019 | Murder of his partner's 4-year-old daughter. | Serving time. |
| 11 | Ana Julia Quezada | 44 | Níjar | 30 September 2019 | Murder of Gabriel Cruz, her partner's 8-year-old son. | Serving time. First woman to be sentenced to a permanent revisable prison. |
| 12 | Mounir Ayad | 33 | Alcobendas | 6 November 2019 | Murder of his 30-year-old partner and her 11-year-old son. | Serving time. |
| 13 | José Enrique Abuín Gey aka El Chicle | 41 | A Pobra do Caramiñal | 17 December 2019 | Murder of Diana Quer, an 18-year-old girl vacationing in the area. | Serving time. |
| 14 | Ada de la Torre | 38 | Bilbao | 27 December 2019 | Murder of her 9-year-old daughter. | Serving time. |
| 15 | Gonzalo Sánchez | 57 | Santa Cruz de Tenerife | 14 February 2020 | Murder of his disabled 60-year-old aunt and partner. | Serving time. |
| 16 | Rubén Mañó Simón | 20 | Chella | 12 August 2020 | Rape and murder of his 15-year-old female friend. | Serving time. |
| 17 | Antonio Pérez Vázquez | 31 | Elche | 30 September 2020 | Abuse and murder of his partner's 2-year-old son. | Serving time. First sentence for a couple. In April 2021, the sentence was quashed by the Supreme Court of Justice of the Valencian Community on the basis of premeditation not being proven; the parents had taken the boy to hospital, where he later died. They were instead each sentenced to 20 years for causing his death, plus three years for cruelty. |
| 18 | Cristina Jiménez Moraleda | 28 | Elche | 30 September 2020 | Failure to render assistance by not intervening to prevent the murder of her 2-year-old son committed by her partner. | Serving time. First sentence for a couple. In April 2021, the sentence was quashed by the Supreme Court of Justice of the Valencian Community on the basis of premeditation not being proven; the parents had taken the boy to hospital, where he later died. They were instead each sentenced to 20 years for causing his death, plus three years for cruelty. |
| 19 | Iván Pardo Pena | 35 | Sabiñánigo | 7 October 2020 | Abuse and murder of his 8-year-old niece. | Serving time. |
| 20 | Alejandra García Peregrino | 30 | Elda | 25 November 2020 | Murder of her partner's 8-year-old foster son. | Serving time. |
| 21 | Ana María Baños | 38 | Almería | 9 April 2021 | Murder of her 7-year-old son. | Serving time. |
| 22 | Norbert Feher aka Igor el Ruso | 40 | Andorra | 29 April 2021 | Murder of 39-year-old rancher José Luis Iranzo and two civil guards: 30-year-old Víctor Romero and 38-year-old Víctor Jesús Caballero. | Serving time. First person to be also sentenced to life imprisonment in another country (Italy). |
| 23 | Silvia Acebal Martínez | 30 | Gijón | 27 May 2021 | Murder of her newborn baby. | Serving time. Youngest victim. |
| 24 | Francisco Javier Martínez Broch | 43 | Alicante | 1 June 2021 | Murder of his parents and brother. | Serving time. |
| 25 | Juan Francisco López Ortiz | 46 | Vilanova i la Geltrú | 8 June 2021 | Kidnap, rape and murder of a 13-year-old girl. | Serving time. |
| 26 | Juan Carlos Jiménez Jiménez | N/A | Cáseda | 16 June 2021 | Murder of a 51-year-old man and his two 29- and 16-year-old sons. | Serving time. First sentence for two members of the same family (father and son). |
| 27 | Emilio Jiménez Jiménez | N/A | Cáseda | 16 June 2021 | Murder of a 51-year-old man and his two 29- and 16-year-old sons. | Serving time. First sentence for two members of the same family (father and son). |
| 28 | Irene Torres Torres | N/A | La Matanza de Acentejo | 4 October 2021 | Abuse and murder of her 5-month-old daughter. | Serving time. |
| 29 | Joey Lee Mederos Martín | N/A | La Matanza de Acentejo | 4 October 2021 | Failure to render assistance by not intervening to prevent his partner from abusing and murdering her 5-month-old daughter. | Serving time. |
| 30 | Bernardo Montoya | 50 | El Campillo | 10 December 2021 | Rape and murder of a 26-year-old woman. | Serving time. First person to have already been sentenced for murder before. |
| 31 | Anonymous man | 31 | Sant Vicent del Raspeig | 5 January 2022 | Murder of his 63-year-old mother and attempted murder of his father. | Serving time. |
| 32 | Thomas Handrick | 46 | Adeje | 17 February 2022 | Murder of his 39-year-old wife and his 10-year-old son. Attempted murder of his 7-year-old son. | Serving time. |
| 33 | Ana Sandamil | 45 | Cospeito | 20 February 2022 | Murder of her 7-year-old daughter. | Serving time. |
| 34 | Marian C. | N/A | Jerez | 9 March 2022 | Murder of his wife. | Serving time. |
| 35 | Adriana Ugueto | 40 | Logroño | 14 March 2022 | Murder of her 5-year-old daughter. | Serving time. |
| 36 | Mariano Daniel Vásquez | 34 | Viladecans | 1 April 2022 | Failure to render assistance to his 36-year-old partner, filming her during a metabolic crisis caused by her type 1 diabetes. | Serving time. |
| 37 | Ginés S. A. | 45 | Elche | 19 October 2022 | Murder of his partner's 7-month-old son. | Serving time. |
| 38 | Adrián González Sisa aka El Plátano | 18 | Madrid | 9 December 2022 | Murder of a 17-year-old rival of a rival gang. | Serving time. Youngest person sentenced to permanent revisable imprisonment. |
| 39 | José Luis Abet Lafuente | 44 | Valga | 24 March 2023 | Murder of his 39-year-old ex-wife, as well as his former mother-in-law and sister-in-law. | Serving time. |
| 40 | Francisco Javier Almeida López de Castro | 54 | Lardero | 18 April 2023 | Sexual abuse and murder of a 9-year-old boy. | Serving time. |
| 41 | Igor Postolache | 31 | Oviedo | 28 April 2023 | Murder of a 14-year-old girl. | Committed suicide in prison on 9 August 2023. |
| 42 | Andrés Gómez S. | 42 | Albacete | 18 July 2023 | Murder of a 51-year-old disabled woman. | Serving time. |
| 43 | Adrián Negrut | 23 | Estepa | 24 November 2023 | Murder of a 17-year-old girl with whom he had a baby. | Serving time. |
| 44 | Beatriu Friginal | 40 | Godelleta | 31 January 2024 | Murder of her paraplegic 45-year-old husband. | Serving time. |
| 45 | José Antonio A. C. | 47 | Sueca | 1 February 2024 | Murder of his 11-year-old son. | Serving time. |
| 46 | Héctor James T. G. | 58 | Xàbia | 28 February 2024 | Murder of the 96-year-old owner of the house where he lived and worked. | Serving time. Oldest person sentenced to permanent revisable imprisonment. Oldest victim. |
| 47 | Eugenio Delgado | 28 | Monesterio | 27 May 2024 | Rape and murder of a 42-year-old woman. | Serving time. |
| 48 | Cristina Rivas | 36 | Sant Joan Despí | 29 May 2024 | Murder of her 4-year-old daughter. | Serving time. |
| 49 | Pedro Antonio Guevara Tovar aka El Margarito | 34 | Lorca | 29 May 2024 | Murder and rape of a 51-year-old woman. | Serving time. |
| 50 | José del Carmen R. F. | 52 | Almonacid de Toledo | 7 June 2024 | Murder of his 42-year-old ex-wife. | Serving time. |
| 51 | Santiago Cepeda Quintela | 31 | Santiago de Compostela | 13 June 2024 | Murder of his 3-year-old nephew. | Serving time. |
| 52 | Nazzaryn Navarro Núñez | 23 | Alcalá la Real | 4 July 2024 | Rape and murder of a 14-year-old girl. | Serving time. |
| 53 | David Soler aka El Tuvi | 30 | Carcaixent | 15 December 2024 | Abuse, torture and murder of a 19-year-old girl. | Serving time. |
| 54 | Marcos F. | 36 | Barcelona | 9 January 2025 | Scam and murder an 81-year-old man and his 80-year-old wife. | Serving time. First double permanent revisable imprisonment. |
| 55 | David Maroto López | 44 | Valladolid | 24 January 2025 | Murder of his 45-year-old partner and her 8-year-old daughter. | Serving time. |
| 56 | Ali Khouch | 35 | Sa Pobla | 3 February 2025 | Murder of his pregnant 28-year-old wife and his 7-year-old son. | Serving time. |
| 57 | José Reñones | 43 | Liaño | 3 February 2025 | Murder of his 40-year-old partner and his 11-month-old daughter. | Serving time. |
| 58 | Fernando Peña | 26 | Chiloeches | 4 March 2026 | Burglary, arson and murder of a 52-year-old man and his 53-year-old wife, as well as their 22-year-old daughter. | Serving time. |

== Sources ==
- Reform on Penal Code (full text, Spanish).
