= Fejér (disambiguation) =

Fejér may refer to:

- Fejér County, Hungary
- Fejér (former county), Hungary
- Fejér (surname), Hungarian surname
