= Fejér (surname) =

Fejér is a Hungarian-language surname. It may refer to:

- Andor Fejér (born 1960), Hungarian electrical engineer and politician
- András Fejér (born 1955), Hungarian cellist
- Jules Fejer (1914–2002), Hungarian physicist
- George Fejer (Hungarian: Fejér György) (1766–1851), Hungarian author and cleric
- George Feyer, born György Fejér (1921–1977), Canadian cartoonist
- George Feyer (pianist), born György Fejér (1908–2001)
- Géza Fejér (1945–2025), Hungarian discus thrower
- Lipót Fejér (1880–1959), Hungarian mathematician
- Tamás Fejér (1920–2006), Hungarian film director

== See also ==
- Feyer (surname)
