= Murder of Diana Quer =

Case of murder in Galicia, Spain

- Location: A Pobra do Caramiñal, Galicia, Spain
- Date: 22 August 2016; 10 years ago
- Attack type: Murder, kidnapping
- Deaths: 1
- Victim: Diana Quer
- Perpetrator: José Abuín
- Motive: Sexual abuse
- Charges: Aggravated murder; Kidnapping; Sexual assault; Rape
- Verdict: Not guilty of rape; Guilty on remaining charges
- Sentence: Life imprisonment without the possibility of parole

In the early hours of 22 August 2016, 18-year-old Diana Quer went missing in the small town of A Pobra do Caramiñal in Galicia. The case went unsolved for over a year and gathered widespread national media attention.

In December 2017, 41-year-old José Abuín, a.k.a. "El Chicle", confessed to the murder of Quer while being interrogated for an attack on another woman, and revealed the location of the body. "El Chicle" was found guilty on 17 December 2019 of aggravated murder, kidnapping and sexual assault, and received life imprisonment.

The Spanish media were criticised by some for having reflected "morbid fascination" and "sensationalism". They were also criticised for revealing and publishing personal information and rumours about Quer's family, and for criticising her lifestyle.

== Background ==
Diana María Quer López-Pinel (born 12 April 1998) was from Pozuelo de Alarcón in the Community of Madrid and was on holiday with her mother and sister.

Quer was left by her mother at 10:30 pm and went to a local festival. Her last known location was a kilometre from home, at around 2:50 am. Among her final WhatsApp messages were to a friend from Madrid: "I'm freaking out, a gypsy was calling for me...[He was saying] 'brown-haired girl, come over here'".

== Investigation ==
Two hundred local men who were aged in their late 30s and had criminal records were interviewed by police over the case. This was later reduced to 80 of them whose mobile phone records confirmed that they were in the vicinity of the crime. Among these was the perpetrator José Enrique Abuín Gey alias "El Chicle" ("The Chewing Gum"), who had a previous conviction for cocaine dealing. He was given a false alibi by his wife, who said that they were with each other at the time. In October 2016, a fisherman found Quer's iPhone 6 in nearby Taragoña.

In the early hours of 25 December 2017, El Chicle attempted to invite several young women into his car in nearby Boiro. He tried to force one into the boot of his car at knifepoint, but her screams drew attention. During his interrogation, he confessed to killing Quer; he tied her up and took her into his car by force and strangled her. He revealed the location of the body, in a well at an abandoned warehouse in Rianxo, 20 kilometres from the location of the crime and only 200 metres from his own house.

== Trial ==
After four days of deliberation, the jury at Santiago de Compostela unanimously found El Chicle guilty of murder. A life sentence was ordered due to aggravating factors of premeditation, sexual motive and motive of hiding a previous crime. While a sexual motive was proven, the jury cleared him of attempted rape. He also received a further four and a half years for kidnap and sexual assault of Quer, and five years for the attempted kidnap in Boiro. He was fined €130,000 to each of Quer's parents and €40,000 to her sister, as well as legal costs.

El Chicle was held at the A Lama and Teixeiro prisons in Galicia, but was moved to Villahierro near León to avoid reprisals from former associates and rivals from the cocaine trade. His prison mail showed no sign of repentance, and attempted to implicate his ex-wife in the murder. He became socially dominant at Villahierro, where his fellow inmates included David Oubel, another Galician from Moraña, who was the first person sentenced to life imprisonment since the sentence was reintroduced in 2015.

== Media coverage ==
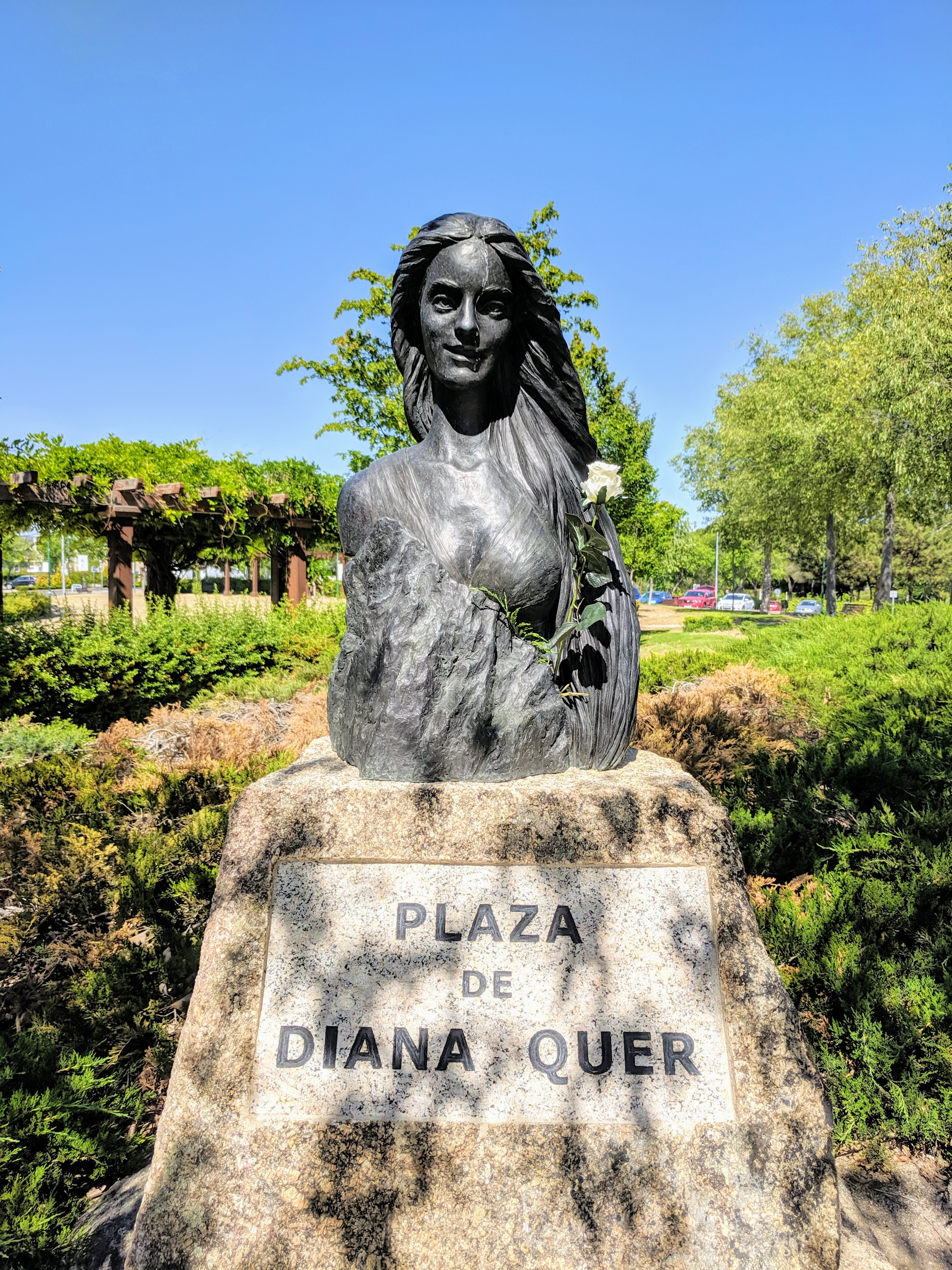
Monument to Quer in her hometown of Pozuelo de Alarcón

The missing person case and subsequent murder trial received a large amount of media coverage. Some news outlets were criticised for relying on morbid fascination or sensationalism in their coverage. One cited example was the Espejo público programme on Antena 3, which reported that Quer's social media account was still active and speculated as to why. The same programme was condemned by Quer's family in October 2019 for broadcasting an alleged "last photograph" of the murder victim; the relatives believed that it was implying that her clothing was responsible for her death.

Some authors believed that the case had disproportionate coverage as Quer was young, wealthy and female (see Missing white woman syndrome). One case contrasted with that of Quer was of Iván Durán, a 30-year-old man from nearby Baiona, who went missing three days later. Durán's father said that police resources went disproportionately to the search for Quer. An autopsy indicated that Durán committed suicide by firearm shortly after leaving home.

== Legacy ==
In November 2018, a sculpture of Quer was unveiled at a square named after her in her hometown of Pozuelo de Alarcón.
