= David Oubel =

Spanish murderer (born 1975)

- Born: 26 April 1975 (age 51); Avilés, Spain
- Conviction: Murder
- Penalty: Life imprisonment

Details
- Victims: 2
- Date: 31 July 2015

David Oubel Renedo (born 26 April 1975) is a Spanish murderer who killed his two daughters Candela and Amaia, aged 9 and 4 respectively, in Moraña, Galicia, on 31 July 2015.

Oubel received the landmark of being the first person sentenced to life imprisonment in Spain (Spanish: prisión permanente revisable) since the relevant legislation was passed in March 2015 and enacted at the start of July. Oubel was convicted on 6 July 2017.

== Background ==
Oubel was born and raised in Avilés in Asturias. Oubel confessed to his crimes in court, but did not explain a motive, and denied that he had a mental illness. The prosecutor Alejandro Pazos believed that Oubel was not mentally ill, but had elements of narcissistic and psychopathic personalities. Oubel received the maximum penalty due to the aggravating factors of malice aforethought – he sedated his victims – the age of his victims and his parental responsibility to them. Oubel was also banned from contacting their mother for 30 years, and made to pay her €300,000 in compensation.

== Arrest and aftermath ==
From his arrest, Oubel was detained in the Villahierro prison near León and was only held in Galicia during his trial. For reasons of security he remains in Villahierro instead of serving his sentence in Galicia or his native Asturias. Jose Enrique Abuín Gey, aka "El Chicle", another Galician serving a life sentence for the murder of Diana Quer, is also incarcerated there. Prison staff have described Oubel as an isolated man who does not speak to staff or inmates.

In March 2020, Oubel was sentenced to another three and a half years in prison for appropriating €69,651 from eight homeowner associations between 2012 and 2015.

In 2022, the mother of the girls criticised a television company for approaching her for a docuseries about the murders. While she said no to any involvement, the producers then said that the events were in the public interest and could be dramatised without her permission.

By June 2023, Oubel had only paid €258 of the €300,000 compensation to the mother, compared to her legal expenses of €20,000. The mother, who had to move house and was unable to work due to grief, said that the state should pay compensation to families of murder victims, as it is in the case of terrorism.
