= Whistle Town =

Canadian children's television series

- Genre: Children's television
- Written by: Cliff Braggins; John Gerrard
- Country of origin: Canada
- Original language: English
- No. of seasons: 1

Production
- Producer: John Kennedy

Original release
- Network: CBC Television
- Release: 30 September 1958 – 25 June 1959

Whistle Town is a Canadian children's television series that aired on CBC Television in the 1958–59 season.

== Premise ==
Danny (Rex Hagon) lives in the fictional Whistle Town with his friend Foster, a puppet (voiced by Jack Mather). The Tuesday episodes are set in the community's toy shop which is owned by Mr. Bean (Larry Beattie) and staffed by his assistant (Jack Mather). Thursday episodes were set in the town's fire station. Other characters included Mr. Haggarty (Hugh Webster), a postman (Claude Rae), Ross (Ross Snetsinger) and Mayor Jacques (Jean Cavall). Alan Crofoot and George Feyer portrayed other roles.

Episodes included musical performances by Jean Cavall and Ed McCurdy. Cartoons and news films were included with songs and sketches.

== Production ==
John and Linda Keogh developed the puppetry for the series, including Foster.

== Scheduling ==
The half-hour program was broadcast on Tuesdays and Thursdays at 5 pm from 30 September 1958 until 25 June 1959.
