= Fehér =

Feher, or more properly Fehér, is a surname of Hungarian origin, meaning white. Bearers of the name include the following:

- Andrei Feher (born 1991), Romanian-Hungarian-Canadian conductor
- Csaba Fehér (born 1975), Hungarian footballer
- Emily Feher (born 1985), American water polo player
- Friedrich Feher
- George Feher (1924–2017), American physicist
- György Fehér (1939–2002), Hungarian film director and screenwriter
- Ilona Feher (1901–1988), Hungarian/Israeli violinist
- Klára Fehér
- Marius Feher
- Michel Feher
- Miklós Fehér (1979–2004), Hungarian footballer
- Sandy Feher, Hungarian-American footballer
- Norbert Feher (born 1981), Serbian criminal
- Zoltán Fehér (born 1981), Hungarian footballer
- Zsolt Fehér (born 1975), Hungarian footballer
- Zsolt Fehér (footballer born 1985), Hungarian footballer

== Places ==
- Fehér County, the Hungarian name for Alba County, Romania
- Fehér County (former) a former county of the Kingdom of Hungary and (Grand) Principality of Transylvania, now in Romania
