= Lapa de Gargantáns =

Menhir in Galicia, Spain

Lapa de Gargantans
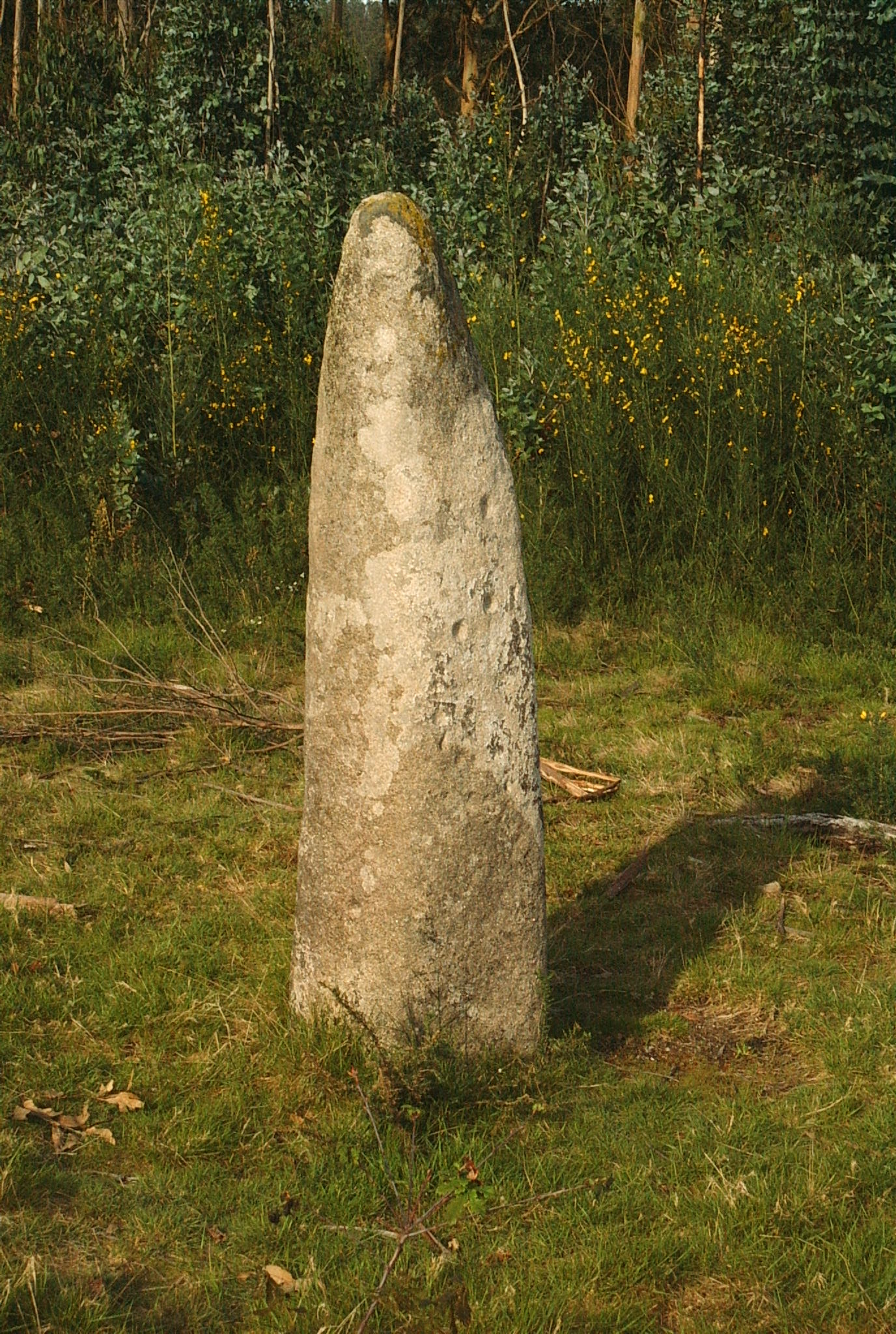
- The menhir in 2008
- Interactive map of Lapa de Gargantans
- 42°34′11″N 8°34′59″W
- Type: Menhir
- Location: Galicia, Spain

History
- Built: c. 2500 BC

Site notes
- Material: Stone
- Height: 1.92 m (6 ft 4 in)
- Diameter: 50 cm (20 in)
- Discovered: 1958

The Lapa de Gargantáns is a menhir located in the Galician municipality of Moraña, dated between 3000–2000 BC and discovered in 1958.

== Description ==
It is 1.92 meters high and 50 centimeters in diameter, its base is cut, so probably the original height was greater. Several petroglyphs are engraved on its surface.

In Galician, the word lapa, among other meanings, designates a stone that marks a burial. However, its exact function is unknown, and some archaeologists associate it with funerary, religious or commemorative signs, or ancient territorial boundaries between tribes.
