= Keszthely culture =

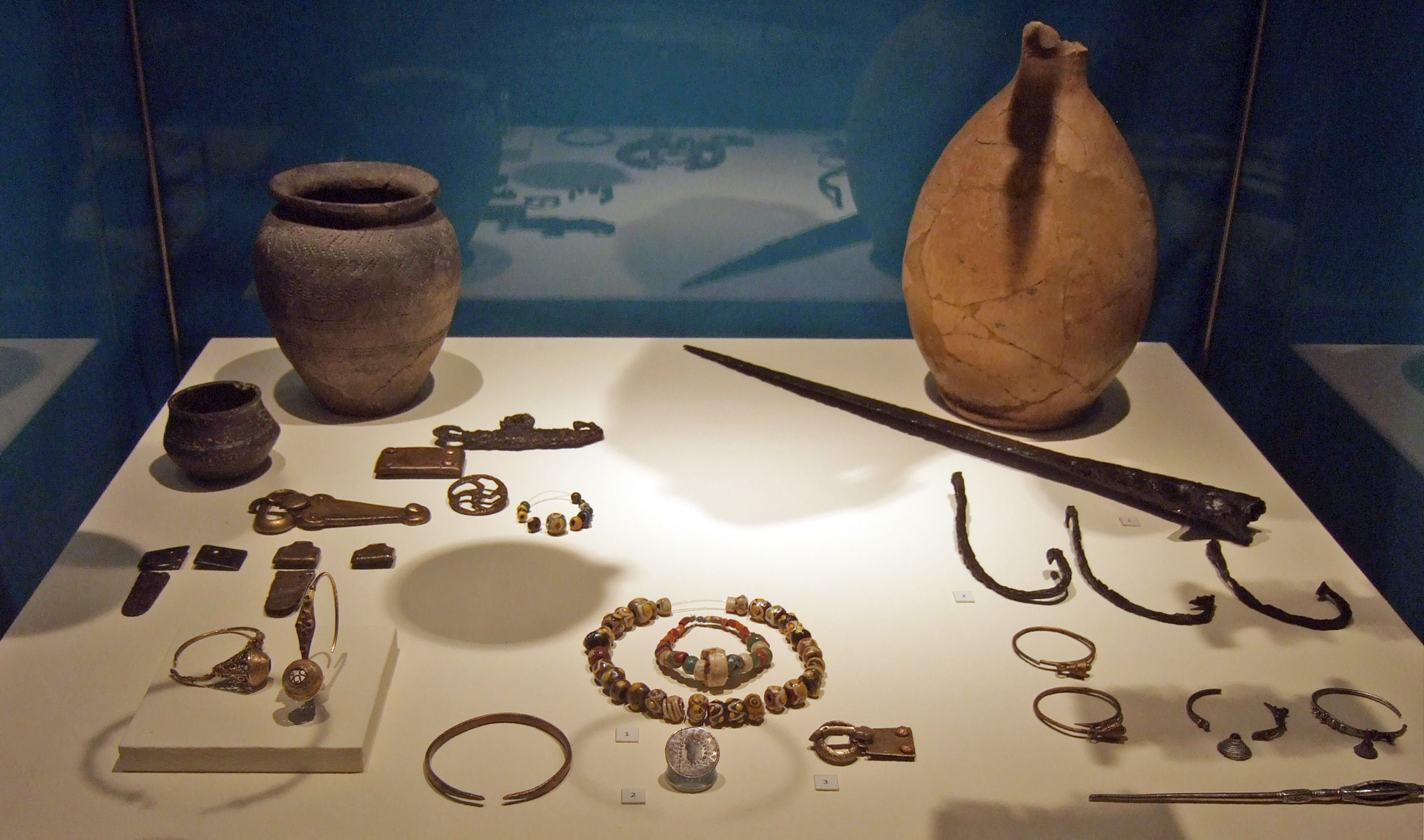
Archaeological remains of the Keszthely culture.

The Keszthely culture was a mixed Romanised population-Germanic-Avar, Christian enclave located in present-day Hungary, from the 6th century until the first half of the 7th century. These people could be found near the northern part of Lake Balaton and around Keszthely in a roughly 30 km area. The culture had faded out by the 7th century.

According to one theory many people of this culture were craftsmen, abducted or invited to that region in the mid-6th century by the Avars. These settlers, or slaves, came from the Balkans, Dalmatia, the eastern Alpine region and the Germanic lands. Historian Florin Curta mentions a second, more recent understanding of the material traces, namely "a deliberate imitation of West European fashions by the inhabitants of the western parts of the qaganate."

== History ==
Research into the population's history is complicated due to a lack of written sources, so only archaeology can be relied upon.

The culture can be divided into two periods: the early period, which lasted until the end of the 6th century, and the late period, up until the middle of the 7th century.

=== Early Period ===
The first archaeological evidence of this culture dates from approximately 568 CE. The Christianized peoples who settled (or perhaps were coerced to settle) the region by the Avars established the culture. According to one theory, these Germanic peoples were Lombards, but some believe they may have been Allemanni, Visigoths or Burgundians.

=== Late Period ===
During the early Avar rule, a Christian basilica was built in the area, considered a religious centre of the culture. The basilica's plan is similar to other buildings of the kind in the Eastern Roman Empire.

At the end of the 6th century and the beginning of the 7th century, a change can be observed in the Christian tombs excavated in the area, suggesting a population turnover caused by immigrants. The newcomers were likely newly baptized Avar Christians.

=== Disappearance ===
From the diminishing number of tombs it can be gleaned that the culture, even with new settlers, was rapidly declining. By the first half of the 7th century, most had likely assimilated into the Avar culture, and the record contains little further evidence of their activities. According to some theories, the Kutrigur-Avar civil war caused the culture's destruction.

== Language ==
=== Early Period ===
On the basis of grave goods and archaeological finds such as coins, József Hampel determined that the Keszthely culture was formed by the Christian Germanic population that settled there in the 5th century. The language spoken by these peoples in the early period was likely Germanic.

=== Late Period ===
The population may have also adopted other languages later on, when settling Avar Christians replaced the Germanic population. More people likely began to speak Avar.

=== Initial theories ===
==== Latin or Roman continuation ====
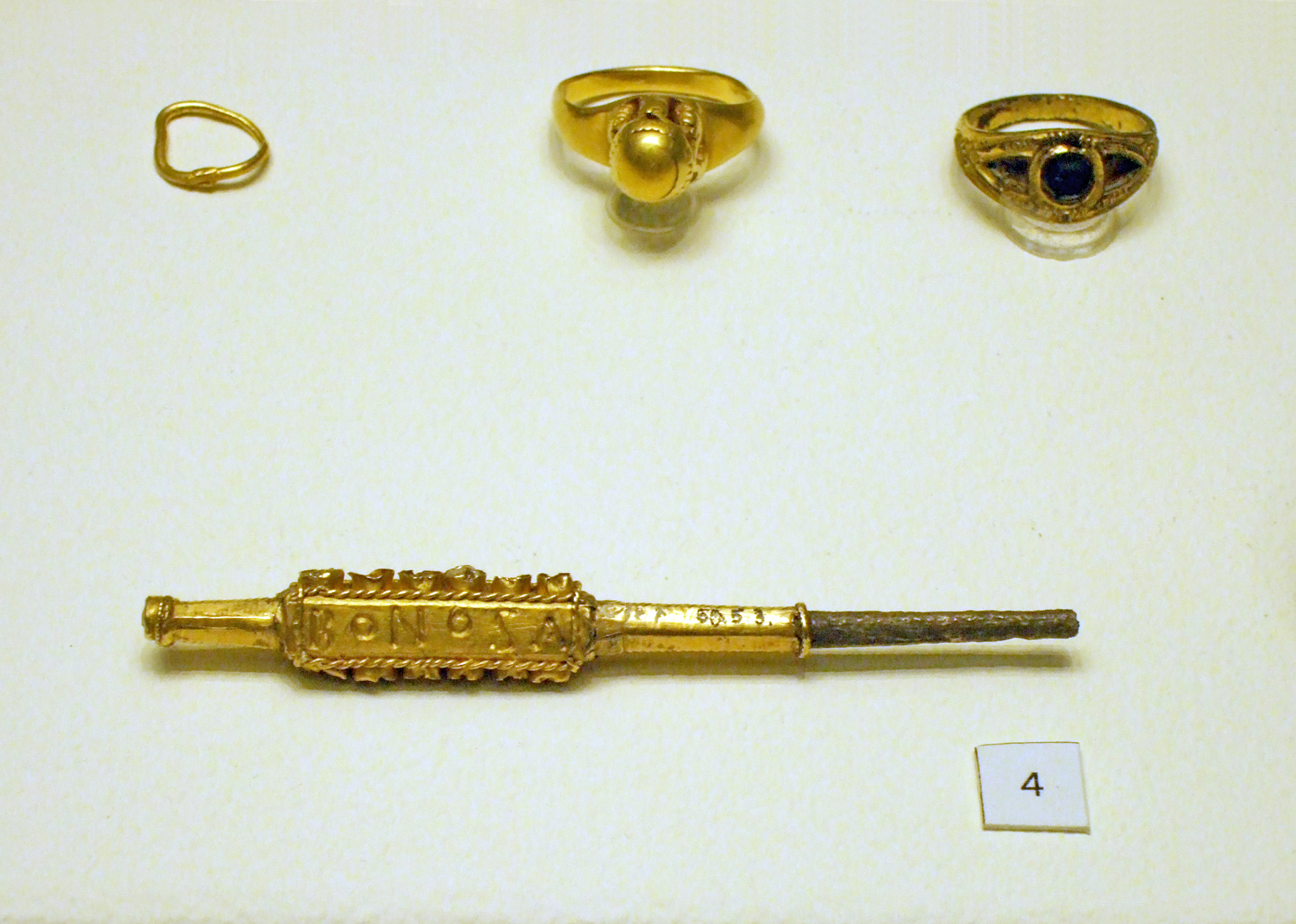
Hairpin found during excavation, with the Latin inscription "BONOSA"

In early stages of research, Roman-style jewellery and grave goods (basket pendants, clothespins, disc fibulae and snake-head bracelets) were found, and a few decades later, a piece of jewellery with Latin writing on it (the writing was BONOSA, meaning "good") was discovered. According to some researchers, the population of the early Keszthely culture consisted mainly of local Christian Roman peoples. The renovation of the old Christian basilica adds to that theory. It can be assumed that the vast majority of the Germanic people who immigrated were Christians.

Other researchers argue that these conclusions were drawn from only a few graves, but now over 6000 graves have been excavated, proving beyond doubt that there was no Roman influence in the early period, and that these objects were later additions, as spoils of war by the Avars. The number of Roman or Byzantine style jewellery pieces is negligible compared to the number of Germanic style jewellery, which was placed at the time of burial. Even in the early stages of the research, some found it suspicious that more than 150 years had passed between the last Roman presence in Pannonia and the time when this culture was formed.

In the early stages of research, the Austro-Czech linguist Julius Pokorny suggested that the name of the town of Keszthely could be derived from the Istriot-Venetian word "castei" (castle), but later, he himself and other scholars refuted this, as the name of the town is derived from the Slavic word "Kostel" or the German word "Kestenholz" (chestnut tree). Also, the Roman name for this settlement was Mogentiana, which does not resemble its name in the present-day. Today, the German name of the city is Kesthell.

==== Sarmatian or Hunnic ====
The Sarmatian, or Hun, theory only emerged at an early stage of research, when nomadic arrowheads were found. However, now it has been proven that the earliest graves date back to 568 CE. As this date is long after Sarmatians and Huns were present in Pannonia, this theory has generally been ruled out by later researchers.

== Roman ruins ==
According to some researchers, the Germanic peoples who had founded this culture settled in earlier Roman ruins, which had not been used for nearly 150 years, and were abandoned by the local Roman and Romanized populations after the Visigoth invasion of 401 CE. The settlers occupied the Roman ruins, maintained the Roman fortress as well as the Roman cemeteries and roads, and otherwise repaired them. It can be observed that these peoples started to use the cemeteries located along former Roman roads near Keszthely, as well as the cemetery next to the Roman fortress. Evidence of the settlers adding to and repairing prior architecture can be seen with the discovery of Avar-style iron picks found near the tower.

The Castellum (Roman fortress) in Keszthely–Fenékpuszta, inside the Basilica II and the Horreum (Granary)

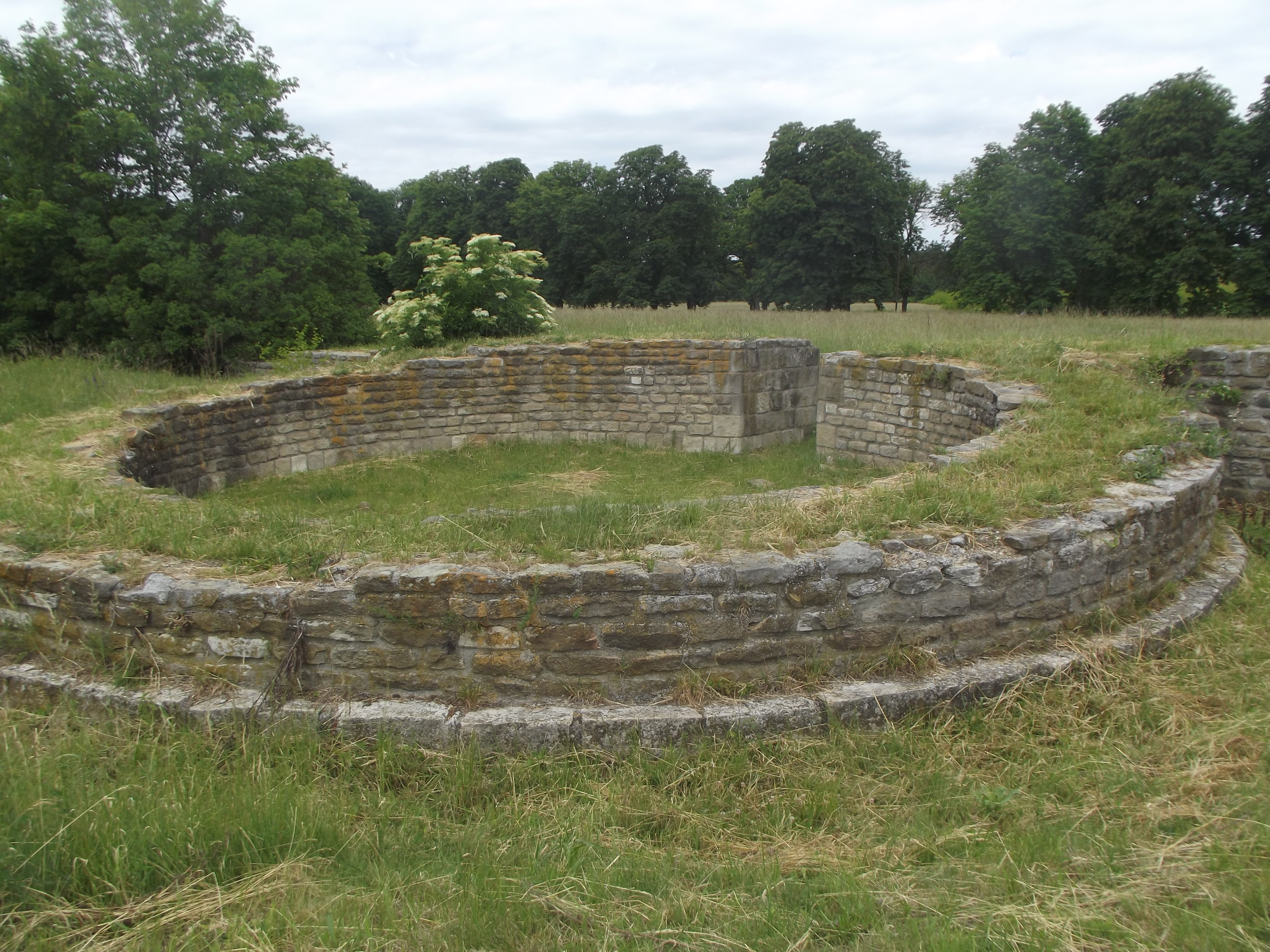
South Gate, ruins from the Roman period

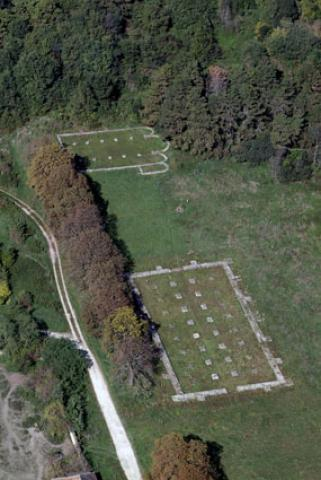
Basilica II (top) and the Horreum (bottom)

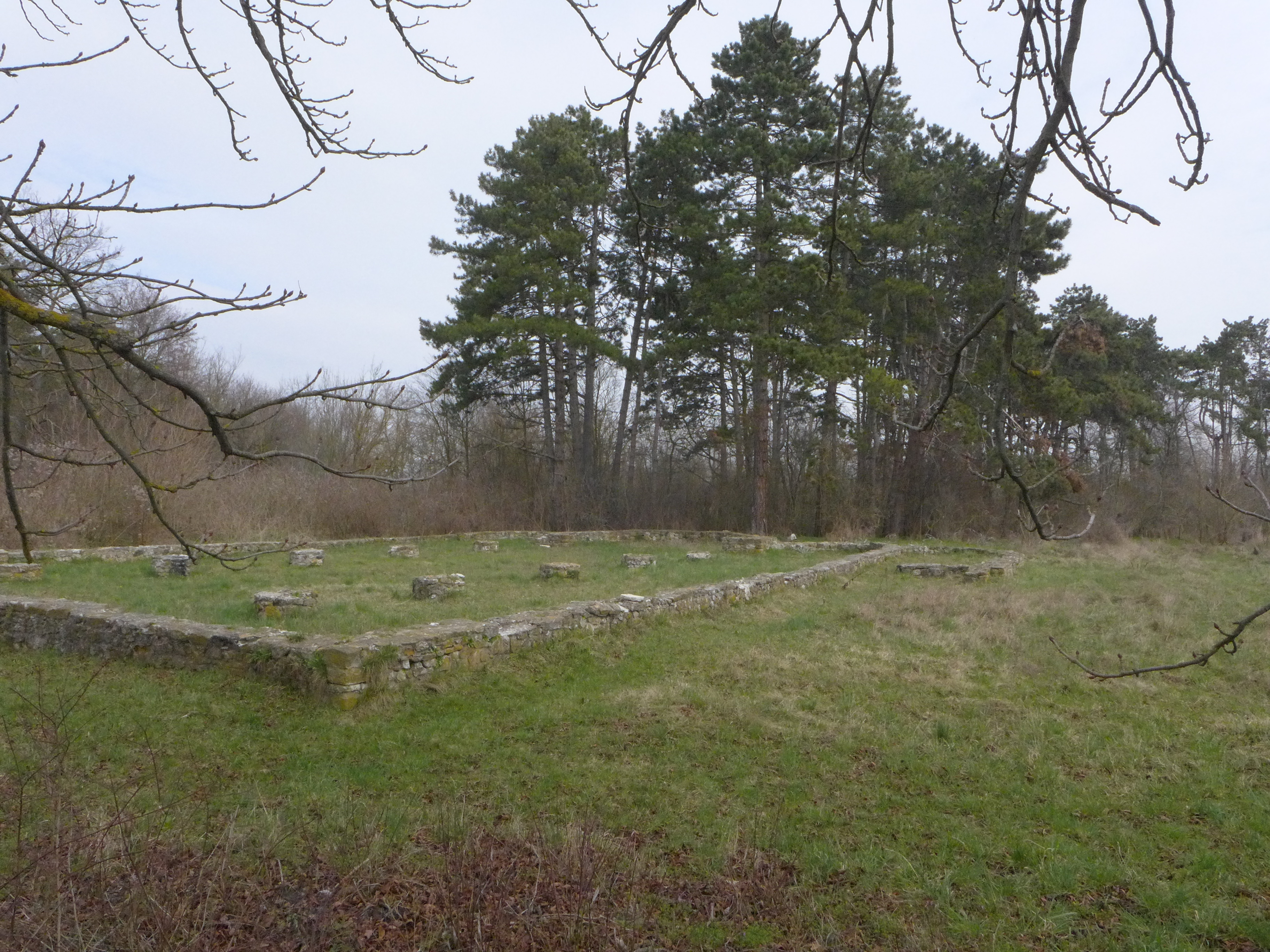
The basement of the Basilica II

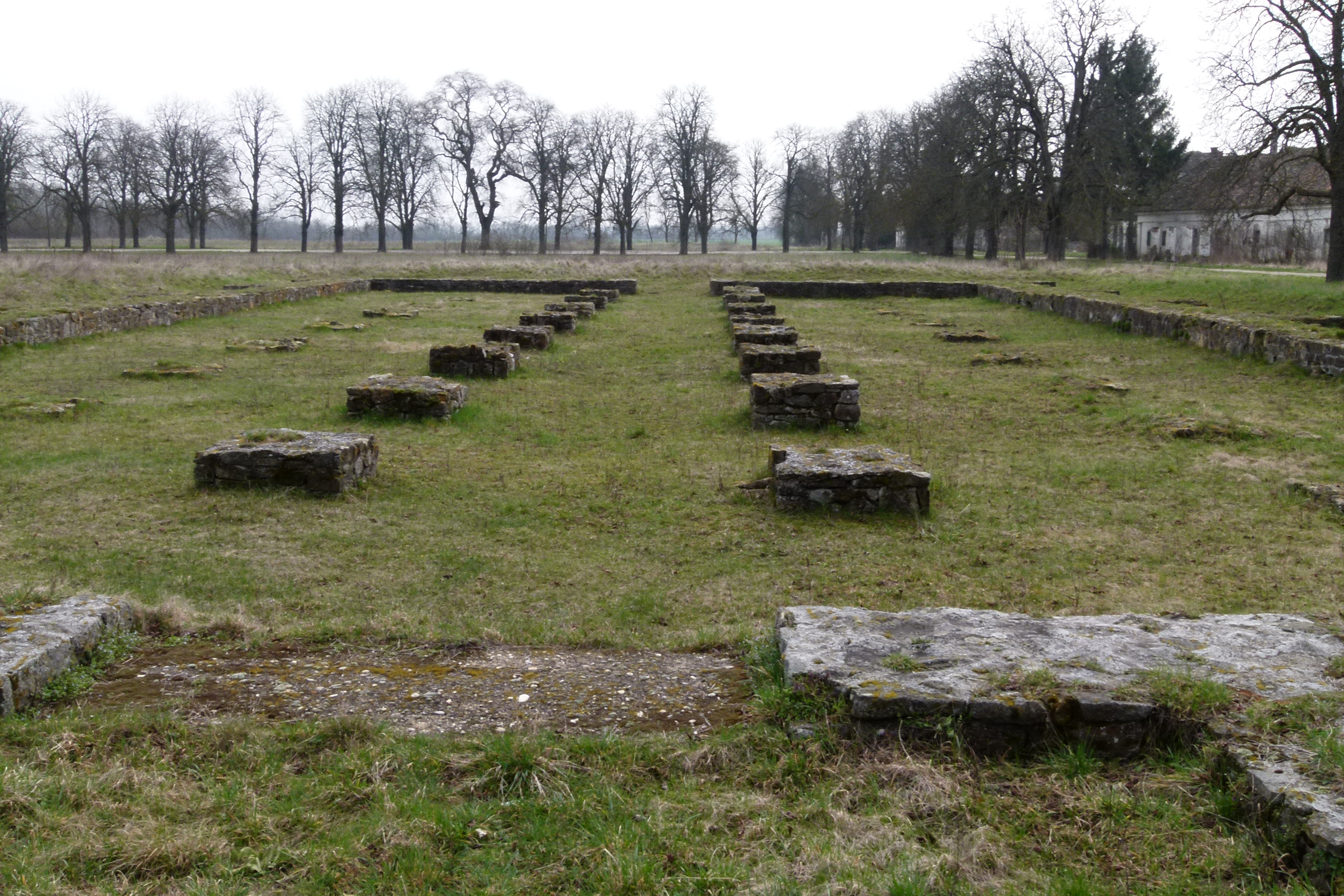
The basement of the Horreum

== Handicrafts and archeology ==
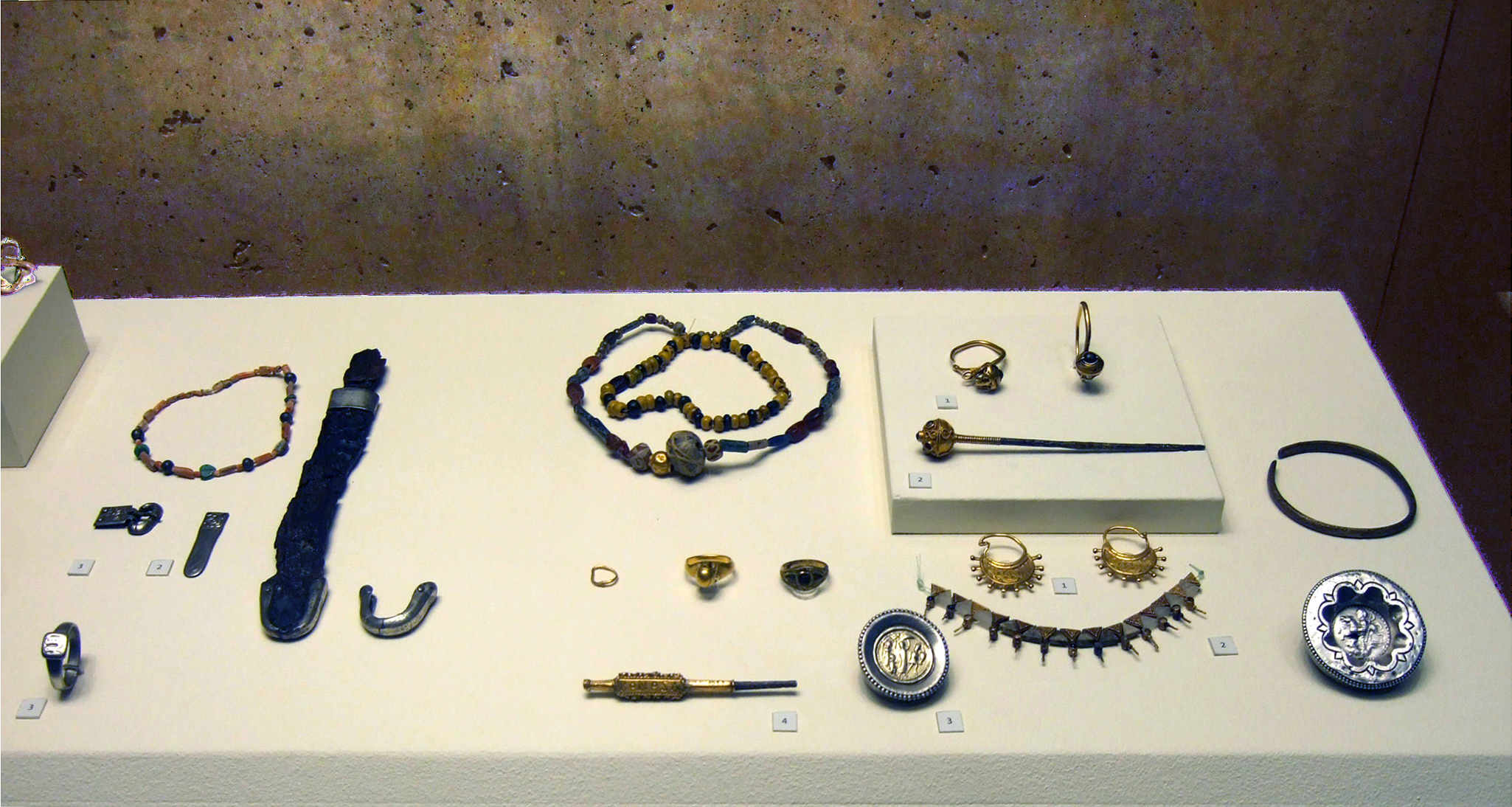
Germanic grave goods

From the very beginning of the culture, two types of arrowheads were found: the three-fingered arrowhead typical of the Avars and other nomadic steppe peoples, and the spherical arrowhead typical of the Germanic peoples. Typical Avar weapons such as the armour-piercing arrow, the reflex bow, the kopja, or the single-edged sword were not found, but Germanic double-edged axes were found several times. Weapons are rare in graves here, but the finds are only of Avar or other nomadic or Germanic types.

Late Roman artifacts are very rare, and it is very rare for a female's tomb to contain both a Roman needle and a fibula. Less than 12% of the graves contained both fibulae and hairpins. Grave decorations are not uniform, there are hardly any Roman motifs on the women's jewellery, but there are many examples of jewellery with Germanic motifs.

One notable find is a hairpin with the Latin word BONOSA (meaning "good") embossed on it. Archaeological techniques have established that the needle was added after the initial burial, which is confirmed by the fact that the tomb (and the surrounding 30 graves) otherwise contain typical Avar objects. The same trend can also be seen with the few other tombs that show a typical Byzantine or Latin influence. This lead researchers to conclude that the cemetery could not predate the Avar conquest, and that this culture cannot be linked to a hypothetical lingering Roman population.The Byzantine and Latin artifacts are presumably Avar spoils of war.

In 1967, Károly Sági excavated several tombs around the Southwestern Corner Tower, of which 17 tombs are definitely from the Avar era, 14 are probably from the Avar era, and 5 are uncertain, possibly from late antiquity.

From the late period of the culture, many griffin-tendril belt sets have been found.

== Controversy ==
Several researchers argue that the term "culture" is inappropriate to describe the activities of these peoples, as the archaeological evidence is not uniform, and apart from Christianity, there is nothing in common between the graves from the excavated cemeteries.

== Research history ==
Literature about this culture has changed significantly over the past 130 years. Archeologists once thought that the culture originated from a group of late Roman remnant and barbarian Christian immigrant populations, but today, this theory is challenged. Archaeological finds show Germanic and Avar influence predominating in the second period, and between the two periods, practice of Christianity is the only common factor. Towards the end of the culture, Avar artifacts become the overwhelming majority of all discoveries.

== See also ==
- Avars
- Early Christianity
- Germanic Tribes
- Lombards
- Keszthely
- Pannonian Latin
