= Keszthely =

- Town
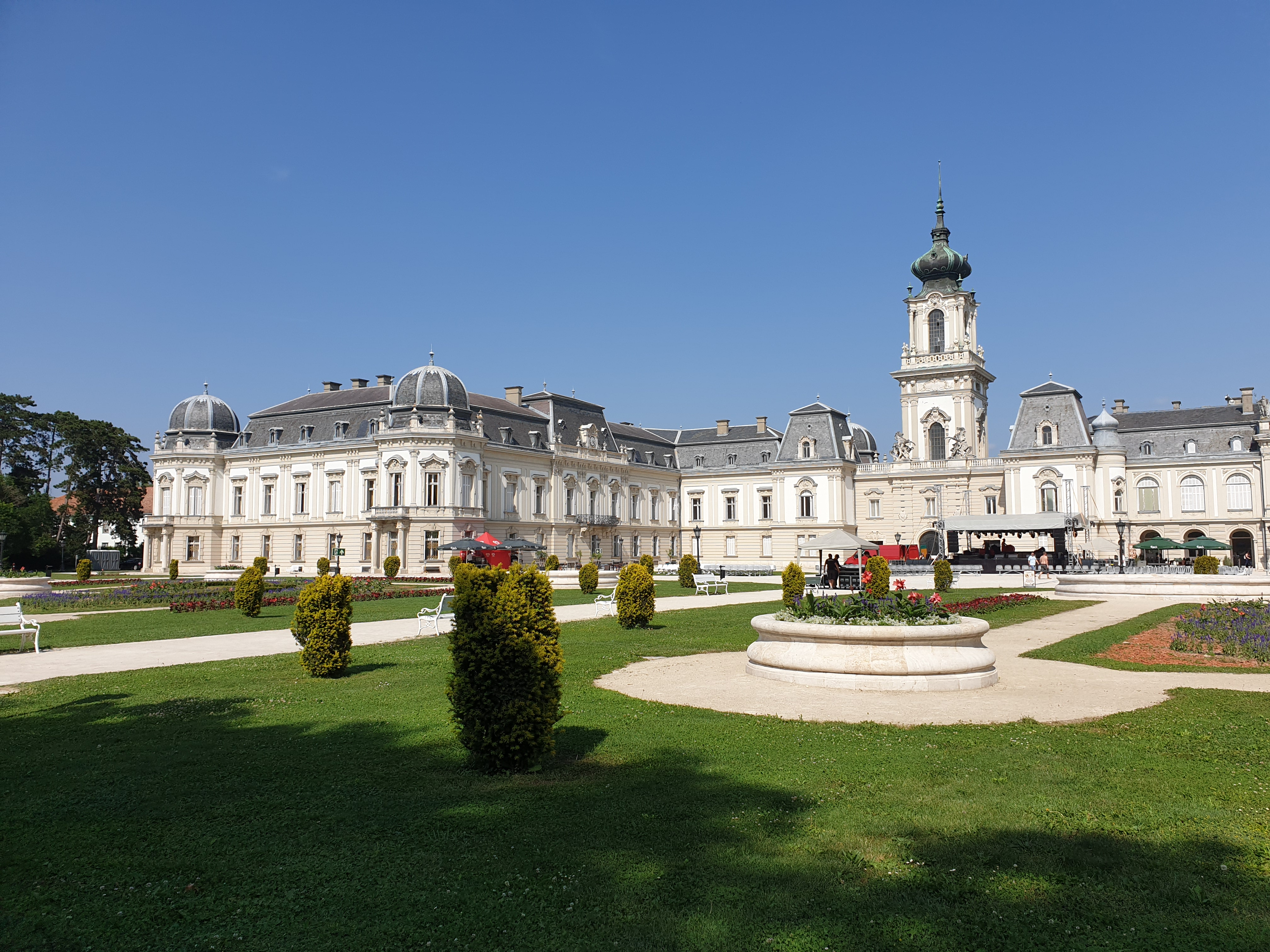
- Festetics Palace in Keszthely

- Flag Coat of arms
- Interactive map of Keszthely
- Location of Keszthely
- Coordinates: 46.76965°N 17.24813°E
- Country: Hungary
- Region: Western Transdanubia
- County: Zala
- District: Keszthely

Government
  - Mayor: Gergely Tóth (VÁRTAK)

Area
  - Total: 75.98 km^{2} (29.34 sq mi)

Population (2017)
  - Total: 19,652
  - Density: 258.65/km^{2} (669.9/sq mi)
- Demonym: keszthelyi

Population by ethnicity
  - Hungarians: 83.6%
  - Germans: 2.1%
  - Romani: 0.6%
  - Croats: 0.2%
  - Poles: 0.1%
  - Slovaks: 0.1%
  - Romanians: 0.1%
  - Ukrainians: 0.1%
  - Others: 0.7%

Population by religion
  - Roman Catholic: 54.5%
  - Greek Catholic: 0.2%
  - Calvinists: 3.2%
  - Lutherans: 1.6%
  - Jews: 0.1%
  - Other: 1.2%
  - Non-religious: 11.6%
  - Unknown: 27.6%
- Time zone: UTC+1 (CET)
  - Summer (DST): UTC+2 (CEST)
- Postal code: 8360
- Area code: (+36) 83
- Motorways: M76 Motorway (planned)
- NUTS 3 code: HU223
- Distance from Budapest: 187 km (116 mi) Southwest
- International airports: Hévíz–Balaton Airport (SOB) previously Sármellék International Airport
- MP: Jenő Manninger (Fidesz)
- Website: www.keszthely.hu

Keszthely (Hungarian pronunciation: [ˈkɛsthɛj]; also known by alternative names) is a Hungarian city of 20,895 inhabitants located on the western shore of Lake Balaton. It is the second largest city by the lake and one of the more important cultural, educational and economic hubs in the region. Due to its favorable location and accessibility by both road and rail, Keszthely and the surrounding area is a preferred holiday destination.

From the middle of the 5th century until the middle of the 7th century the Keszthely Culture flourished in the area.

The Faculty for Agriculture of University of Pannonia is located in Keszthely. George Fejer, Hungarian author and librarian at the University of Pest, was born in Keszthely in 1766.

== Etymology and names ==
The name comes from Slavic *Kostel, see also the etymology of Kesztölc. Hungarian hely: a site, a location. The Hungarian part of the name could be potentially formed by a phonetic similarity and folk etymology Kesztely→Keszthely. 1247 Kesztel.

The city is also known by alternative names in other languages: German: Kesthell; Latin: Mogentiana, later Castellum; and Slovene: Blatenski Kostel.

== Location ==
The city of Keszthely is located on the northwest corner of Lake Balaton, on the shore of one of the biggest lakes in Central Europe. The city is surrounded by forests and rolling hills to the north, plains to the southeast and the lake. South from the city lies Kis-Balaton (Little Balaton), a swamp which is a part of the Zala river delta and acts as a natural water purifier for Lake Balaton. The swamp is particularly known as a water fowl habitat and enjoys international recognition and protection as a nature reserve.

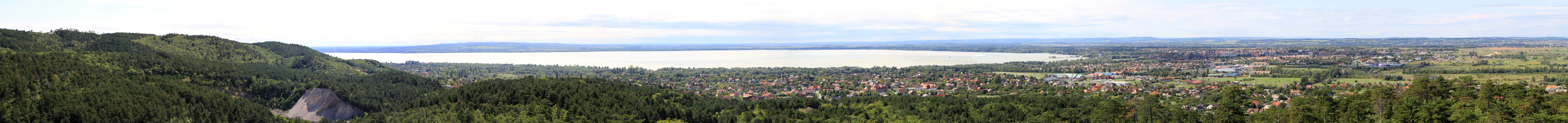

The city also enjoys the proximity of Hévíz, a town famous for its spa and health services. Keszthely is very close to some northern Balaton wine regions which are known to produce high-quality white wines from locally cultivated varieties.

Keszthely is easily and rather quickly accessible by car from both Budapest, the capital of Hungary, and Vienna, the capital of Austria. Direct bus services between Keszthely and Budapest run several times a day.

== Museum ==
Balaton Museum

The Balaton Museum Association was established in 1898 for among all Sandor Lovassy's initiation. The starting of the museum building in Keszthely was in 1925 with the help of count Taszilo Festetics, on the basis of Györgyi Denes's design in Neo-baroque style. With the building of the first museum in Zala county, the stones from pulled down stables next to Festetics Mannsion were used as well. The collection shows the archeological, ethnographical, historical and natural scientific values of the Balaton area.

== Climate ==
Keszthely's climate is classified as oceanic climate (Köppen Cfb). The annual average temperature is 11.0 °C (51.8 °F), the hottest month in July is 21.3 °C (70.3 °F), and the coldest month is 0.1 °C (32.2 °F) in January. The annual precipitation is 638.9 millimetres (25.15 in), of which August is the wettest with 71.4 millimetres (2.81 in), while January is the driest with only 25.0 millimetres (0.98 in). The extreme temperature throughout the year ranged from −20.6 °C (−5.1 °F) on December 21, 2009 to 38.5 °C (101.3 °F) on August 4, 2017.

Climate data for Keszthely, 1991−2020 normals
Month	Jan	Feb	Mar	Apr	May	Jun	Jul	Aug	Sep	Oct	Nov	Dec	Year
Record high °C (°F)	18.6 (65.5)	22.0 (71.6)	24.1 (75.4)	29.4 (84.9)	32.9 (91.2)	35.4 (95.7)	38.1 (100.6)	38.5 (101.3)	32.5 (90.5)	27.2 (81.0)	23.9 (75.0)	18.3 (64.9)	38.5 (101.3)
Mean daily maximum °C (°F)	3.6 (38.5)	6.4 (43.5)	11.7 (53.1)	17.5 (63.5)	21.9 (71.4)	25.7 (78.3)	27.8 (82.0)	27.4 (81.3)	22.0 (71.6)	16.3 (61.3)	9.4 (48.9)	4.1 (39.4)	16.2 (61.2)
Daily mean °C (°F)	0.1 (32.2)	1.8 (35.2)	6.2 (43.2)	11.4 (52.5)	16.0 (60.8)	19.7 (67.5)	21.3 (70.3)	20.9 (69.6)	16.0 (60.8)	10.9 (51.6)	6.0 (42.8)	1.1 (34.0)	11.0 (51.8)
Mean daily minimum °C (°F)	−2.9 (26.8)	−2.0 (28.4)	1.3 (34.3)	5.9 (42.6)	10.1 (50.2)	13.8 (56.8)	15.2 (59.4)	15.1 (59.2)	10.8 (51.4)	6.4 (43.5)	2.9 (37.2)	−1.7 (28.9)	6.2 (43.2)
Record low °C (°F)	−19.5 (−3.1)	−19.7 (−3.5)	−19.0 (−2.2)	−6.4 (20.5)	−1.4 (29.5)	3.7 (38.7)	6.1 (43.0)	5.3 (41.5)	1.2 (34.2)	−9.5 (14.9)	−10.4 (13.3)	−20.6 (−5.1)	−20.6 (−5.1)
Average precipitation mm (inches)	25.0 (0.98)	35.1 (1.38)	31.9 (1.26)	39.0 (1.54)	61.7 (2.43)	69.2 (2.72)	69.5 (2.74)	71.4 (2.81)	68.2 (2.69)	58.6 (2.31)	53.8 (2.12)	44.3 (1.74)	627.7 (24.71)
Average precipitation days (≥ 1.0 mm)	4.7	5.7	5.6	6.3	8.3	8.3	7.2	6.9	7.0	6.5	7.5	6.5	80.5
Average relative humidity (%)	86.1	81.3	72.1	67.1	70.1	71.3	70.5	71.9	77.6	83.9	85.8	87.8	77.1
Source: NOAA

== Twin towns – sister cities ==
Keszthely is twinned with:

- Alanya, Turkey
- Boppard, Germany
- Hof van Twente, Netherlands
- Jędrzejów, Poland
- Levoča, Slovakia
- Odorheiu Secuiesc, Romania
- Piwniczna-Zdrój, Poland
- Stary Sącz, Poland
- Turnov, Czech Republic

== Notable people ==
- Alexander Asboth (1811-1868), Hungarian-American Army Officer who served as a Brigadier General in the American Civil War and as the U. S. Ambassador to Argentina and Uruguay

== Gallery ==
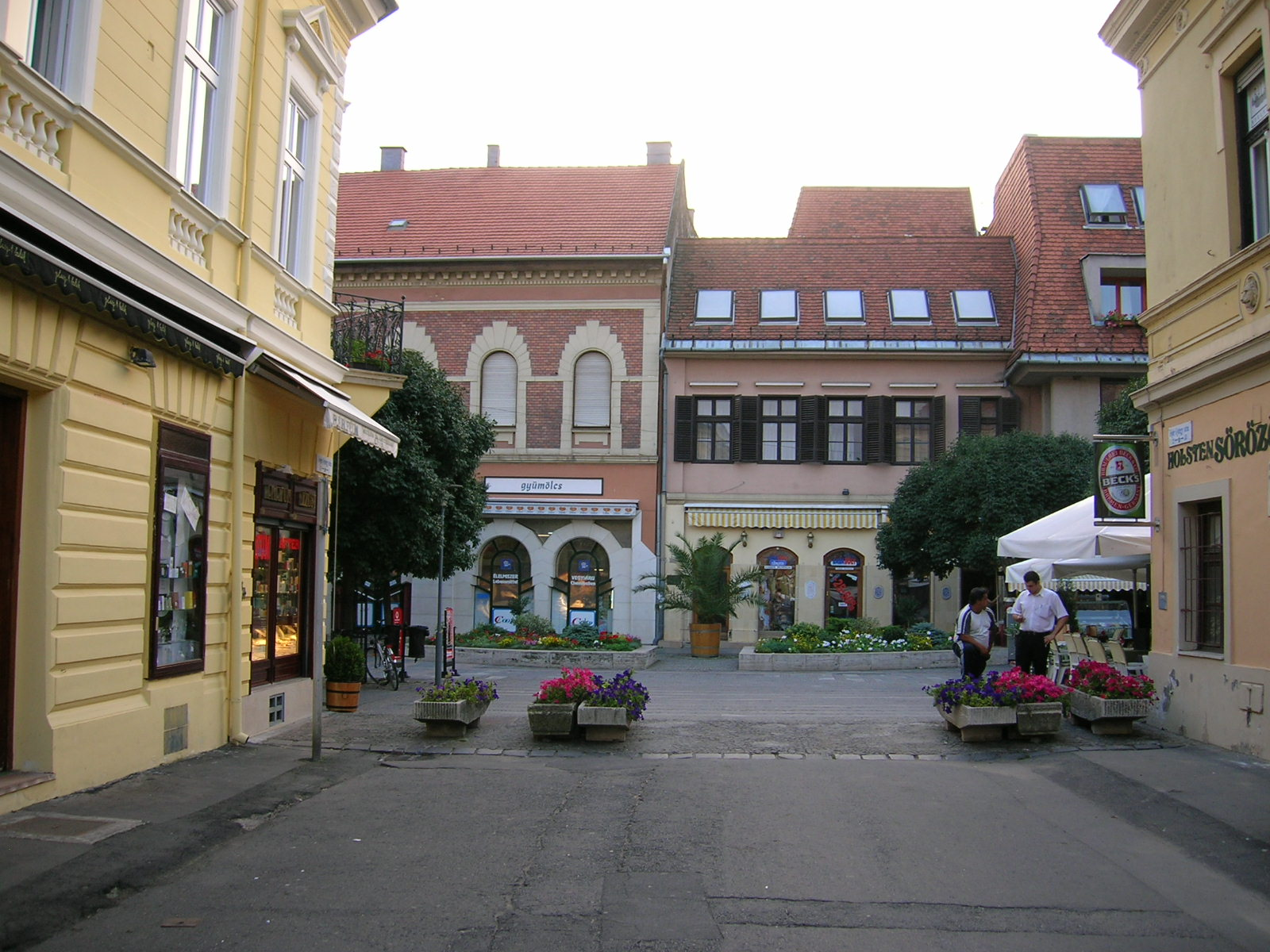
Keszthely town centre

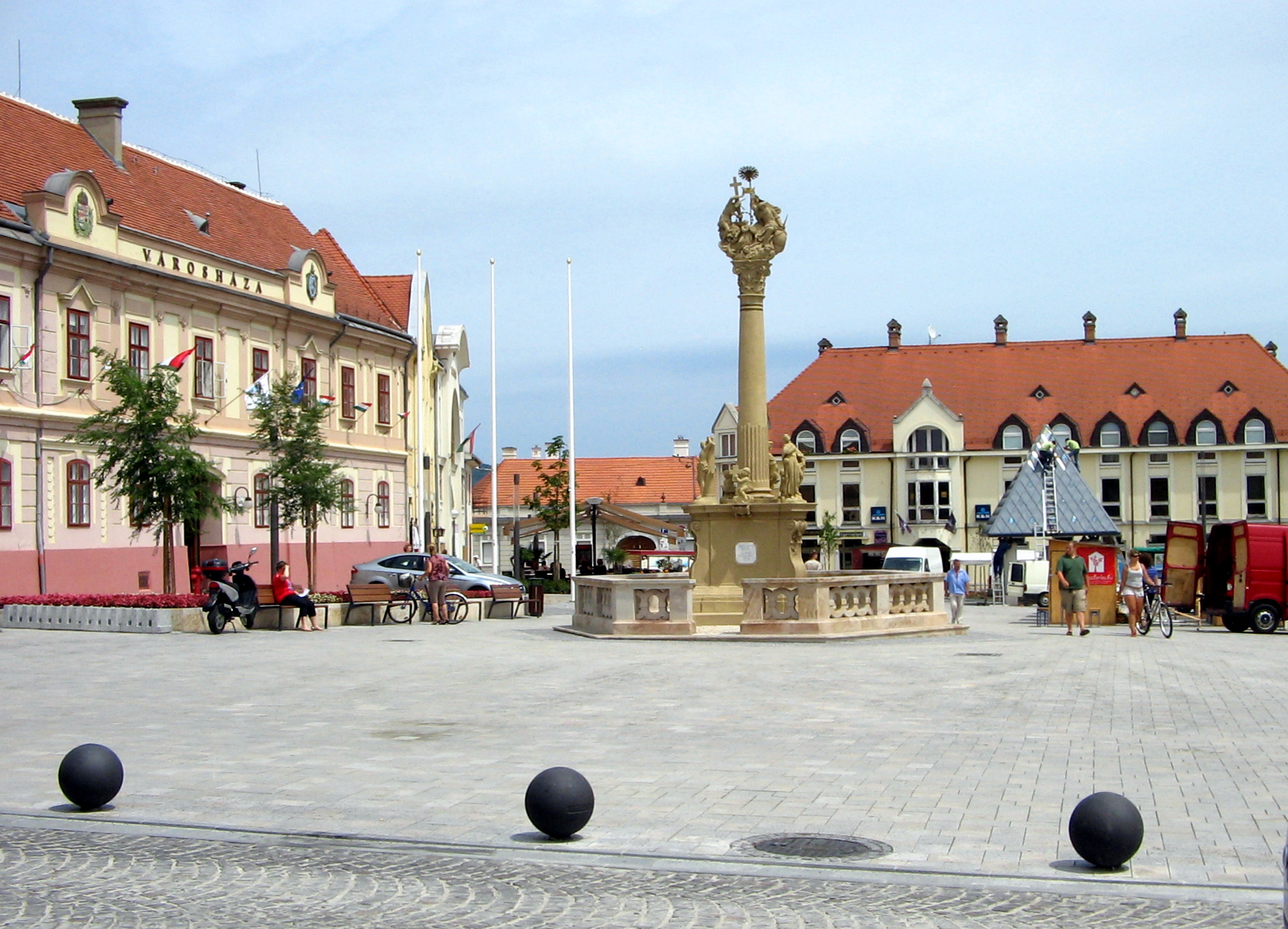
Main square

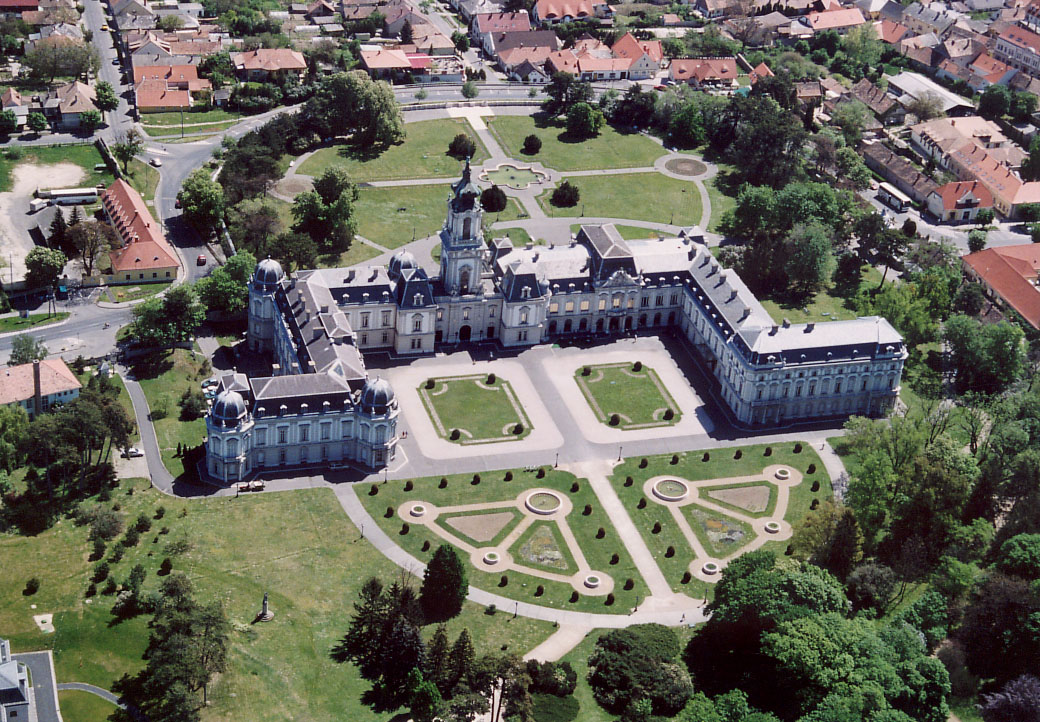
Aerial view of the Festetics Palace

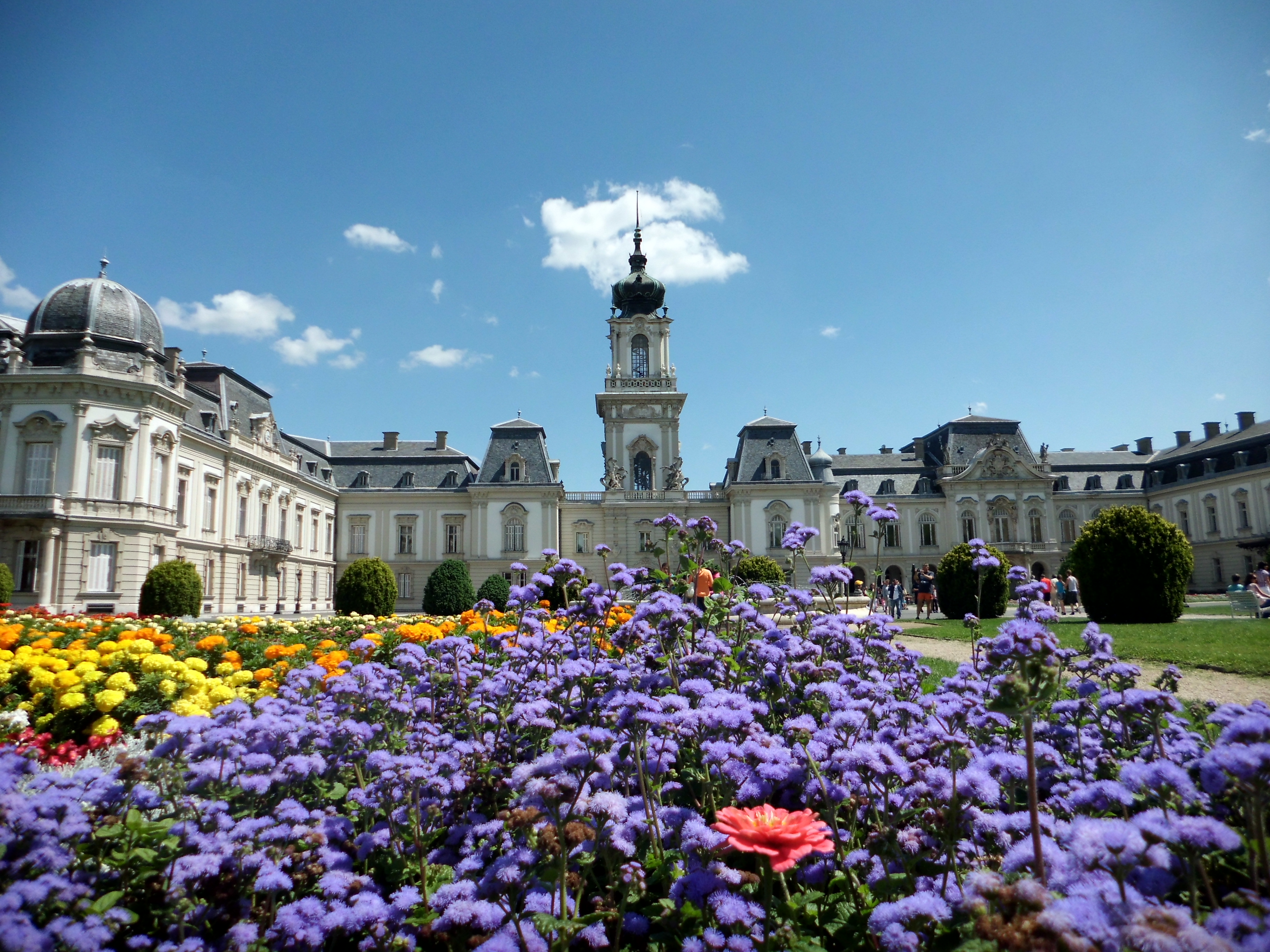
Front view of the palace from the garden fountain

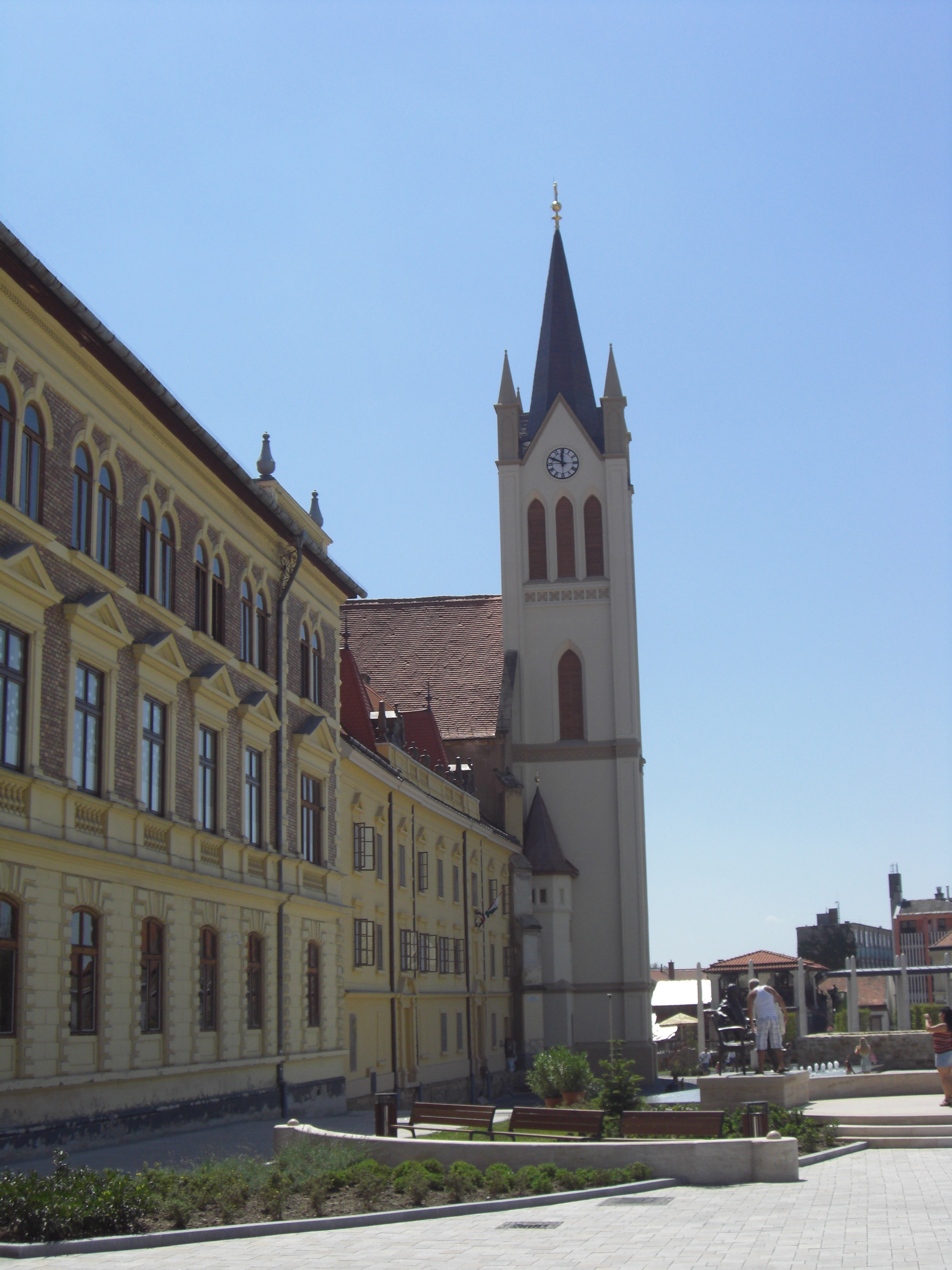
Church of Our Lady of Hungary

== See also ==
- Keszthely culture
- Keszthely Synagogue
