= Clarke, Campbell & Co. =

Canadian experimental television series

- Genre: Experimental
- Presented by: Marion Clarke; Rick Campbell; George Feyer
- Country of origin: Canada
- Original language: English
- No. of seasons: 1

Production
- Production location: Toronto
- Running time: 15 minutes

Original release
- Network: CBC Television
- Release: 28 May – 25 June 1954

Clarke, Campbell & Co. is a Canadian experimental television series that aired on CBC Television in 1954.

== Premise ==
One of the primary hosts of this Toronto-produced series was Marion Clarke (born c. 1932), a Nova Scotia resident who won a beauty-related contest of Chatelaine magazine. As a result, she was brought to Toronto and appeared on CBC's Tabloid. Despite a lack of prior involvement with the media or entertainment industry, she was subsequently hired by the CBC as an announcer and given her own miniseries, The Marion Clarke Show, which was broadcast at 10:40 p.m. from 24 to 26 May 1954 shortly before she was given a leading role in Clarke, Campbell & Co. from 28 May 1954.

The series set resembled an art studio in which Clarke, Rick Campbell, cartoonist George Feyer and a cat were the regular performers. In the debut episode, some insubstantial banter among the cast was followed by a segment where music was played for audio while the camera was focused on the resting cat. Feyer drew cartoons as part of the proceedings.

== Critical reception ==
Ottawa Citizen television critic Bob Blackburn described the series as CBC's "biggest turkey" of 1954. Another Ottawa Citizen critic, Claude Hammerston, described the series as a "monstrosity", noting about the much-promoted Clarke that the CBC "treated her rather shamefully". Alex Barris of The Globe and Mail described the scene of the cat set to music as "uninspired improvization".

== Scheduling ==
This 15-minute series was broadcast on Fridays at 10:45 p.m. (North American Eastern time) from 28 May to 25 June 1954.
