= Norbert Feher =

Serbian serial killer

- Born: 10 February 1981 (age 45); Subotica, SR Serbia, Yugoslavia
- Penalty: Life imprisonment in Italy; Life imprisonment in Spain; 21 years in Spain; 25 years in Spain; 25 years in Spain; 4 years in Spain

Details
- Victims: 5–8
- Span of crimes: 2006–2017
- Country: Italy, Spain
- Date apprehended: 15 December 2017 (9 years ago)

Norbert Feher (Serbian Cyrillic: Норберт Фехер; born 10 February 1981), also known as "Igor the Russian", "Igor Vaclavic" and "Ezequiel", is a Serbian criminal and serial killer of Hungarian ethnicity. He is credited with various crimes of murder and robbery in Italy and Spain. He is currently in the latter serving his sentence after being captured after his last crime in Andorra, Teruel, Spain.

== Biography ==
=== First years ===
Feher was born in 1981 in Subotica, a city in the north of Serbia, in the autonomous province of Vojvodina, with a strong Hungarian presence (then Yugoslavia), son of Jene and Zuzana. According to what he told his fellow prisoners, he served in the Russian Army during the Second Chechen War as a member of the special forces.

Also according to his stories, while he was in Russia, his daughter would have been killed in retaliation against him, moreover she would also have a son. Still according to what was told to his cellmate, after having deserted from the Russian Army he would have moved to China, where he would have learned the Chinese language; in addition to this language he has knowledge of Italian, Hungarian, Romanian, Russian, Serbo-Croatian and a few words of Spanish.

Wanted by the Serbian Police for robbery and sexual violence, he moved to Italy in 2006.

== Crimes in Italy ==
=== Robberies and murders committed in Italy and escape from Italy ===
In 2007, despite his ability to radically change his appearance, Feher was arrested by the Italian authorities for a series of robberies between Ferrara and Rovigo, characterized by the use of sidearms such as bow and knife (which he prefers) and that they had earned him the nickname ninja in the area. At the Rovigo Prison, he presented himself to the Italian authorities under the false identity of Igor Vaclavic, thus avoiding extradition.

Released in 2010, he resumed criminal activity. On 4 November 2011, the chief prosecutor of Ferrara signed an deportation decree, but, in the absence of a certain identification and not having been recognized by Russia (of which he had called himself a citizen), he remained in Arginone Prison until his early release, in 2015. Again sent to the CIE, once again he was not deported. In prison, he maintained exemplary behavior, training (according to his cellmate he woke up at 6 and performed 12 sessions of a thousand abdominals. When he had cramps, he asked to tie his legs to the bed so that he could continue) and watching cartoons (that his father forbade him to see during childhood), so much so that the same chaplain of the prison, for whom he was an altar boy, testified in favor of his rehabilitation. The family (mother, sister and two brothers) who remained in Serbia, and with whom Feher kept in touch, did not help the investigation.

On 1 April 2017, Feher robbed the Gallo bar, in the Riccardina di Budrio frazione, Bologna. The owner, Davide Fabbri aged 52, tries to disarm the robber, snatching the shotgun he was holding, but Feher reacts by firing two shots in the chest with a second weapon, a Smith & Wesson 9×21 semi-automatic pistol stolen on 29 March. Following the robbery, Feher goes into hiding, pretending to be wounded, in an area of forty square kilometers in the marshes of Ferrara, where on 8 April 2017, he kills the provincial guard Valerio Verri and seriously injures another. Despite the use of 150 men per shift, belonging to special teams equipped with infrared night vision goggles and thermal goggles and molecular dogs, the killer was not captured. Feher even goes so far as to challenge the police who hunt him down; probably his inaction is also favored by the help of his friends and former accomplices.

=== Subsequent investigations in Italy ===
On 30 December 2015 Salvatore Chianese, 42, was murdered in a quarry in Fosso Ghiaia (Ravenna). The police detectives found that the shotgun used in the murder matches that of the robbery at the Bar Gallo in April 2017.

== Crimes in Spain ==
=== Arrival in Spain, robberies and murders in Spain and arrest and detention in Spain ===
On 17 May, a postcard was delivered to the central command of the carabinieri in Ferrara in which Feher communicates that he has left Italy even though his arrival in Spain was estimated in September. According to what was communicated to the Spanish authorities, in the escape from Italy to Spain, Feher would have crossed 8 countries using 18 different identities. On 5 December, Feher storms a farm, only to be discovered by the owner and a blacksmith, both of whom are wounded by the killer. Alerted, Víctor Romero Pérez, 30, and Víctor Jesús Caballero Espinosa, 38, who are part of a team dedicated to investigating thefts in the rural environment rush to the scene: both, despite being equipped with bulletproof vests, are killed by Feher who appropriates their service weapons. Feher is arrested by the Spanish authorities in the town of Andorra, around 2:50 am on 15 December, after a car accident while on the run that leaves him unconscious. Despite the request of the Italian authorities for extradition, the Spanish authorities seem determined to try Feher for the crimes committed on their territory. Feher is being held in custody in a maximum security prison without the possibility of bail, where he has accused him of illness.

On 11 April 2021, Feher detained in Dueñas prison, Spain, tried to injure an official by hitting him with two tiles taken from the bathroom of his cell and injure five officers too. Feher did not want to be transferred to the Zuera prison where he remained awaiting trial for the triple murder.

On 30 March 2023, Feher hit two prison guards again, as he did in 2021, injuring them with two filed tiles in Estremera Prison.

On 28 July 2023, Feher was sentenced to an additional 4 years for assaulting prison officers in 2021.

== The sentences ==
=== Spain ===
On 3 February 2020 he was sentenced by the Provincial Court of Teruel to 21 years in prison for two murders and illegal possession of weapons.

=== Italy ===
Subsequently, he is tried for the numerous crimes committed in Italy. Sentenced in first instance to life imprisonment by the Bologna Court of Assise, the sentence was also confirmed on appeal.

== See also ==
- List of serial killers by country
- List of serial killers by number of victims
