= György Fejér =

Hungarian author

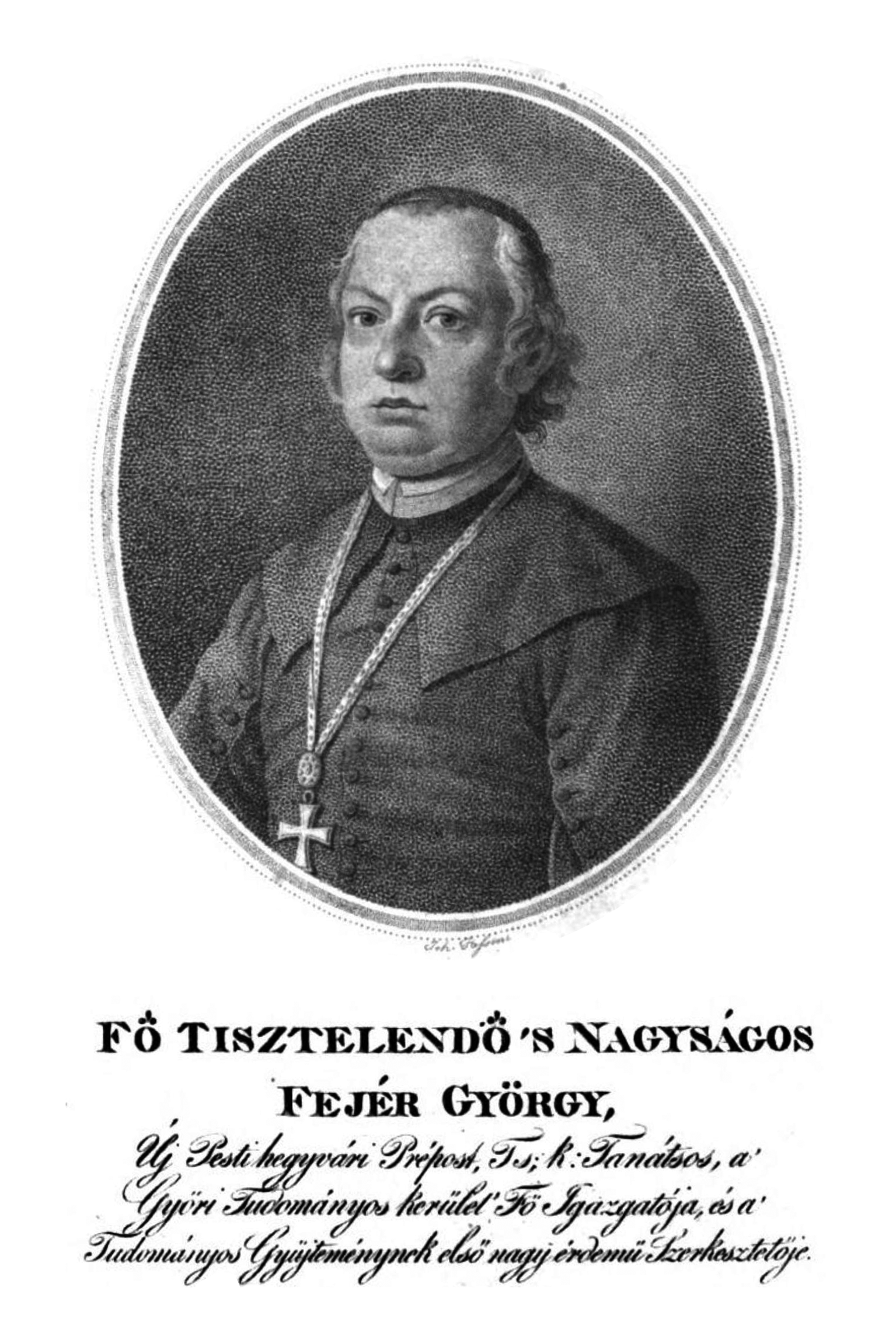
- Fejér in an 1820 publication
- Born: Fejér György; April 23, 1766; Keszthely, Hungary
- Died: July 2, 1851 (aged 85); Pest, Hungary
- Education: Philosophy and Theology
- Occupations: Writer, Librarian
- Years active: 1808–1850
- Organization: Eötvös Loránd University
- Notable work: Codex diplomaticus Hungariae ecclesiasticus no civilis
- Title: Director of the Library, University of Pest
- Term: 1822–1843

György Fejér (Hungarian: Fejér György, Latin: Georgius Fejér) (April 23, 1766 – July 2, 1851) was a Hungarian author, Provost – Canon, and Director of the Library, was born at Keszthely, in the county of Zala in Hungary.

He studied philosophy at Pest, and theology at Pressburg. In 1808, he obtained a theological professorship at Pest University. In 1818, he became chief director of the educational circle of Győr (German: Raab), and in 1824 was appointed librarian to the University of Pest. Fejér's works, which are nearly all written either in Latin or Hungarian, exceed one hundred and eighty.

His most important work, Codex diplomaticus Hungariae ecclesiasticus no civilis, was published in several volumes from 1829 to 1844. It consists of old documents and charters from 104 to the end of 1439, and forms an extraordinary monument of patient industry. This work and many others relating to Hungarian national history have placed Fejér in the foremost rank of Hungarian historians.

His later works were A Kunok eredete (The Origin of the Cumans), and A politikai forradalmak okai (The Causes of Political Revolutions), both published in 1850. The latter production, on account of its liberal tendencies, was suppressed by the Austrian government.

== Sources ==
- Magyar Irók: Életrajz-gyüjtemény (Pest, 1856), (English: Hungarian Writers: Biography Collection)
- A magyar nemzeti irodalomtörténet vázlata (Pest, 1861), (English: The National Outline of Literary History)
