= Thomas Feyer =

Thomas Feyer (born June 2, 1953) is a Hungarian-born American journalist who is letters editor of The New York Times.

== Early life and education ==
Born Fehér Tamás in Budapest, Feyer fled Hungary for Austria with his parents in 1956, emigrated to the United States in 1957 and was naturalized as a U.S. citizen in 1962. He grew up in Manhattan and Queens, New York and graduated from Birch Wathen Lenox School.

He earned a B.A. in history from Princeton University in 1975 and graduated from the Columbia University Graduate School of Journalism in 1976.

== Career ==
Feyer worked at the Associated Press for four years, then became an editor at the New York Times in 1980, working primarily on the foreign desk, and letters editor in 1999. Two other editors assist him in choosing 10 to 15 to publish from the approximately 1,000 received every day.
