= Moraña =

Concello de Moraña
- Municipality
- Coat of arms
- Nickname: Moraña
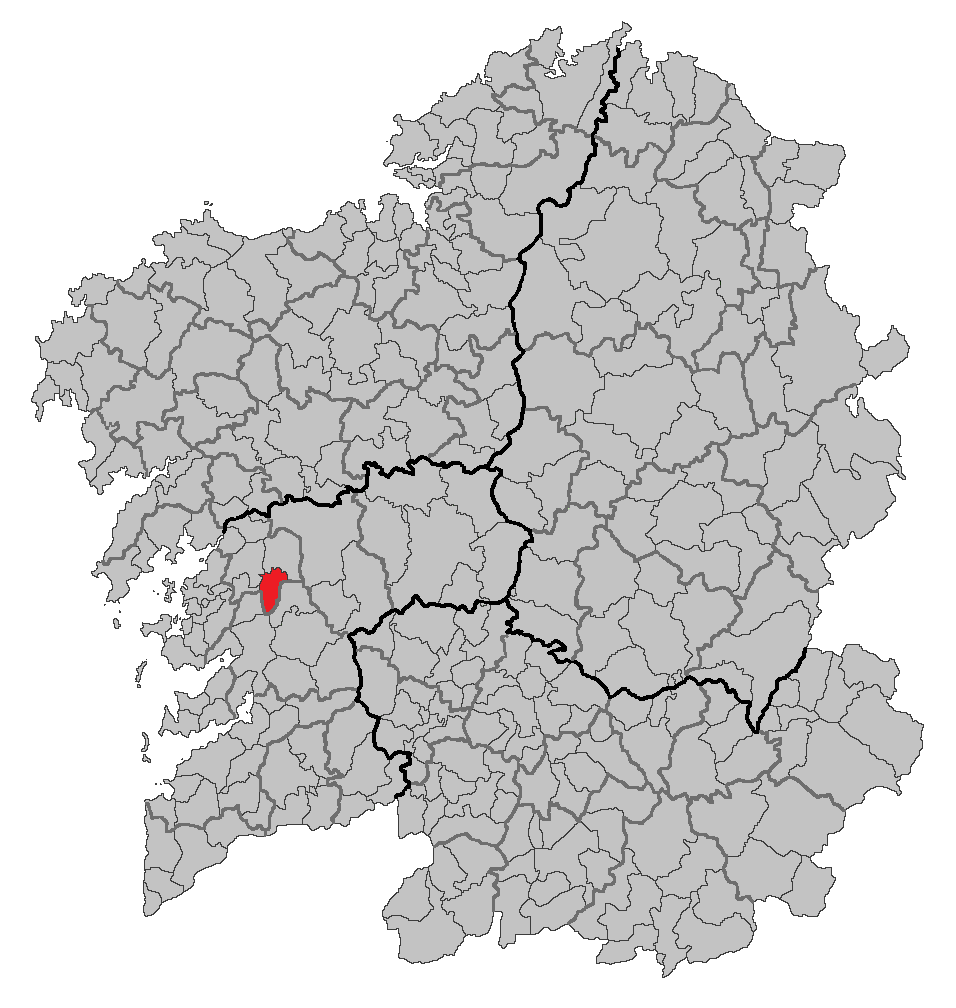
- Location of Moraña within Galicia
- Coordinates: 42°33′N 8°33′W
- Country: Spain
- Autonomous community: Galicia
- Province: Pontevedra
- Parroquias: 9

Government
  - Alcalde (Mayor): José A. Eiras Paz

Area
  - Total: 41.50 km^{2} (16.02 sq mi)

Population (2025-01-01)
  - Total: 4,131
  - Density: 99.54/km^{2} (257.8/sq mi)
- Time zone: UTC+1 (CET)
  - Summer (DST): UTC+2 (CET)
- Website: www.morana.org

Moraña is a municipality in Galicia, Spain in the province of Pontevedra.

== See also ==
- Lapa de Gargantáns
- List of municipalities in Pontevedra
