= George Feyer =

Canadian cartoonist

George Feyer (1921 – March 1967) was a Canadian cartoonist who shot to fame through appearances on CBC Television in the 1950s. As a cartoonist for Maclean's magazine he helped to define the look of Canadian popular culture through the 1950s and 1960s.

== Career ==
Born in Hungary, Feyer emigrated to Canada after the Soviet takeover of that country and found work as a labourer. After publishing a cartoon in Maclean's, he embarked on a lucrative career that included stints as a television personality (on programmes such as Clarke, Campbell & Co.) and animator.

He moved to Los Angeles, California in 1965 to work in Hollywood television production. Feyer was found dead with self-inflicted gunshot wounds at his residence on 30 March 1967.

In 2006 Feyer was inducted into the Canadian Cartoonist Hall of Fame.
