= María Luisa Pérez-Soba =

First female agricultural engineer in Galicia. (1930 – 2021)

- Born: María Luisa Pérez-Soba y Baró; 29 June 1930; Burgos, Spain
- Died: 8 February 2021 (aged 90); A Coruña, Galicia
- Occupation: Agricultural engineer

María Luisa Pérez-Soba y Baró (29 June 1930 – 8 February 2021) was the first woman agricultural engineer in Galicia and the fifth in Spain.

== Early life ==
María Luisa Pérez-Soba y Baró was born on 29 June 1930 in Burgos, Spain. Her family called her "Marisina" and she grew up in A Coruña, Galicia where her father, Antonio Pérez-Soba, was stationed as Spanish army commander in charge of the Brigada Obreira e Topográfica do Estado Maior (Labour and Topographical Brigade), in the Comisión Xeográfica de Galicia (Galicia Geographical Commission). Her mother, María Luisa Baró Morón, was a teacher and encouraged her daughter's interest for her studies before her death when Pérez-Soba was 12. Her maternal grandfather Fernando Baró Zorrilla, was a farmer and forestry engineer. As a child she spent a lot of time involved in Galician agriculture, which is thought to have influenced career choice.

== Education ==
María Luisa Pérez-Soba attended primary school at the San Xosé Madres Xosefinas school in A Coruña, then completed her high school and pre-university education at the Sagrado Corazón de Placeres College in Pontevedra.

In 1954 Pérez-Soba moved to Madrid to study for a degree in agricultural engineering at the Escuela Especial de Ingenieros Agrónomos, now called Escuela Técnica Superior de Ingenieros Agrónomos, part of the Universidad Politécnica de Madrid. She was one of two women in the class of 68 students, the other being Mercedes Soler Sanz. Pérez-Soba graduated ninth in the class in 1959. On 11 July 1960 she completed the professional qualification to use the title of Agricultural Engineer. This made her the fifth woman agronomist in Spain and the first Galician agricultural engineer. Isabel Torán Carré, the first Spanish female agricultural engineer, graduated in 1939.

Pérez-Soba was awarded the title of Doctor of Education by Ministerial Order of 15 July 1963.

== Career ==
Pérez-Soba was the Provincial Delegate in the Industrias e Comercialización Agraria (Agricultural Industries and Commercialisation) department in the office of the Delegation of the Consellaría de Agricultura in A Coruña. She was provincial head of Industries and Agrarian Marketing in A Coruña, part of the Ministry of Agriculture.

Through her work she took spoke at and attended international industry technical congresses and conferences on Agricultural Industries and Commercialisation.

Pérez-Soba was one of the driving forces behind the creation of the Colexio Oficial de Enxeñeiros Agrónomos de Galicia (College of Agronomists of Galicia), being acting as Secretary of the organisation between 1962 and 1976.

== Personal life ==
On 10 November 1961 in Madrid, María Luisa Pérez-Soba married Pedro Fernández Rico, a doctor and agricultural engineer at YRIDA in Coruña. The couple had three children: Pedro, a commercial technician; Álvaro, an agricultural engineer and secondary school teacher; and Gonzalo, a journalist.

María Luisa Pérez-Soba died on 8 February 2021 in A Coruña.

== Recognition ==
In 2021, Pérez-Soba was honoured by the gender equality commission of the Escola Politécnica Superior de Enxeñaría e da Facultade de Ciencias of University of Santiago de Compostela.
