= List of municipalities in Galicia =

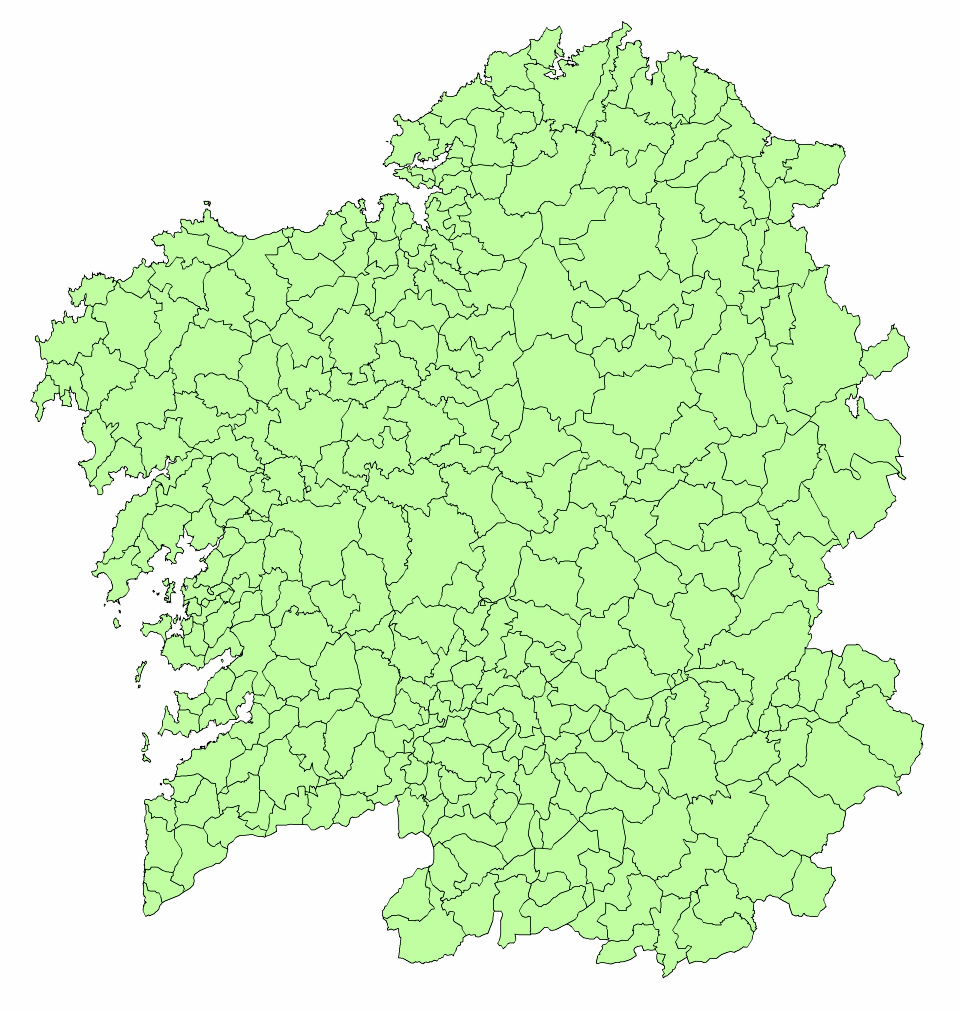
Municipalities in Galicia

The following list is of important municipalities in the Galicia, an autonomous community of Spain:

== Provincial lists ==
The following links are to lists which are more detailed province-specific, and all municipalities in a given province are ranked by population.

- List of municipalities in A Coruña
- List of municipalities in Lugo
- List of municipalities in Ourense
- List of municipalities in Pontevedra

== Largest municipalities by population ==
Rank	Name	Population (2020)
1	Vigo	296,692
2	A Coruña	247,604
3	Ourense	105,643
4	Lugo	98,519
5	Santiago de Compostela	97,848
6	Pontevedra	83,260
7	Ferrol	65,560
8	Narón	39,056
9	Vilagarcía de Arousa	37,565
10	Oleiros	36,534
11	Arteixo	32,738
12	Ames	32,104
13	Carballo	31,429
14	Culleredo	30,685
15	Redondela	29,241
16	Ribeira	26,848
17	Cangas	26,582
18	Cambre	24,594
19	Marín	24,242
20	Ponteareas	22,940
21	A Estrada	20,351
22	Lalín	20,207
23	O Porriño	20,100
24	Moaña	19,452
25	Boiro	18,884
26	Teo	18,632
27	Monforte de Lemos	18,347
28	Nigrán	17,745
29	Sanxenxo	17,414
30	Tui	17,323

== See also ==
- Comarcas of Galicia
