= Celia Brañas =

Spanish scientist and activist (1880–1948)

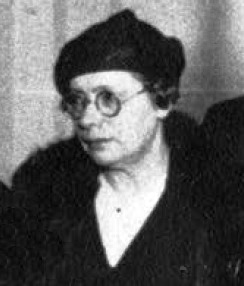
- Celia Brañas y Fernández Miranda (1934)
- Born: Celia Brañas Fernández Miranda; 20 May 1880; A Coruña, Galicia, Kingdom of Spain
- Died: 12 June 1948 (aged 68)
- Occupations: Teacher, scientist

Celia Brañas Fernández Miranda (20 May 1880 – 12 June 1948) was a Spanish scientist and teacher who fought for the education and inclusion of women into the scientific community in Spain.

== Early life ==
Celia Brañas Fernández Miranda was born on 20 May 1880 in A Coruña, the daughter of Consuelo Fernández Miranda from Betanzos and Gonzalo Brañas Sánchez-Boado, a journalist, writer and pharmacist. Her older brother Gonzalo Brañas Fernández (1866–1948) was also a scientist. Her paternal uncle (her father's half brother) was Alfredo Brañas Menéndez, professor at the Law Faculty of the University of Santiago de Compostela and a leading representative of Galician conservative reactionism.

== Education ==
Brañas studied at the Normal School in A Coruña, where she qualified as both an elementary and higher level teacher. She then studied for the Baccalaureate at the local Secondary School. She passed the Reconocimientos de productos comerciales y Prácticas de Laboratorio (Recognition of Commercial Products and Laboratory Practice) course at the Escuela Superior de Comercio. Brañas then attended the University of Santiago de Compostela where she took courses in Mineralogy and Botany, Zoology, Physics and Chemistry, considered the preparatory course for the Faculty of Science.

== Career ==
In 1908, Brañas began working as an assistant teacher at the Normal School in A Coruña, and substituting for the Head of Science. On 8 March 1910 a Royal Order was issued by the Ministry of Public Instruction and Fine Arts abolishing the historic limits on women taking part in further education. A second Act in September that year allowed women to take up the professions they had trained for. Brañas took full advantage of these changes to the law.

In 1911 Brañas passed the competitive examination to become a full Professor of Science and took over the teaching of Physics, Chemistry and Natural History.

Her vision of science teaching echoed the cutting edge teaching developments of the era, using "active teaching" methods. In a handwritten memoir, "Las Ciencias físicas y naturales en las Normales de Maestras", she emphasised the "eminently practical and applied nature" of the subjects and advocated teaching in which theory was accompanied by "experimental demonstration". She advocated taking students on visits to factories and workshops, where they could record observations in notebooks for subsequent explanation and discussion in class, emphasising the "great pedagogical value (of) walks and excursions, especially for the study of Natural History". Faced with the lack of resources in the laboratories of teacher training colleges, she proposed practical activities using everyday objects and described examples of physics and chemistry experiments that could be carried out with simple, accessible materials.

Brañas felt that her responsibility as an educator should not be restricted to the classroom and developed a programme of wider dissemination. In a report she presented in 1909, she expressed her concern that "there is no doubt that in Spain women have very few means to educate themselves, not only in what we could call ornamental or luxury, but in the most indispensable knowledge". She was in favour of teaching general culture courses for women in teacher training colleges. From 1912 she was a forerunner in university extension work in schools, giving lectures on subjects such as Static Electricity, and practical demonstration on Philosophy of History, Progress and Applications of Photography and Education and Instruction of Women.

She was head of the Normal School at various points during her career and retired in 1946.

== Influencing policy ==
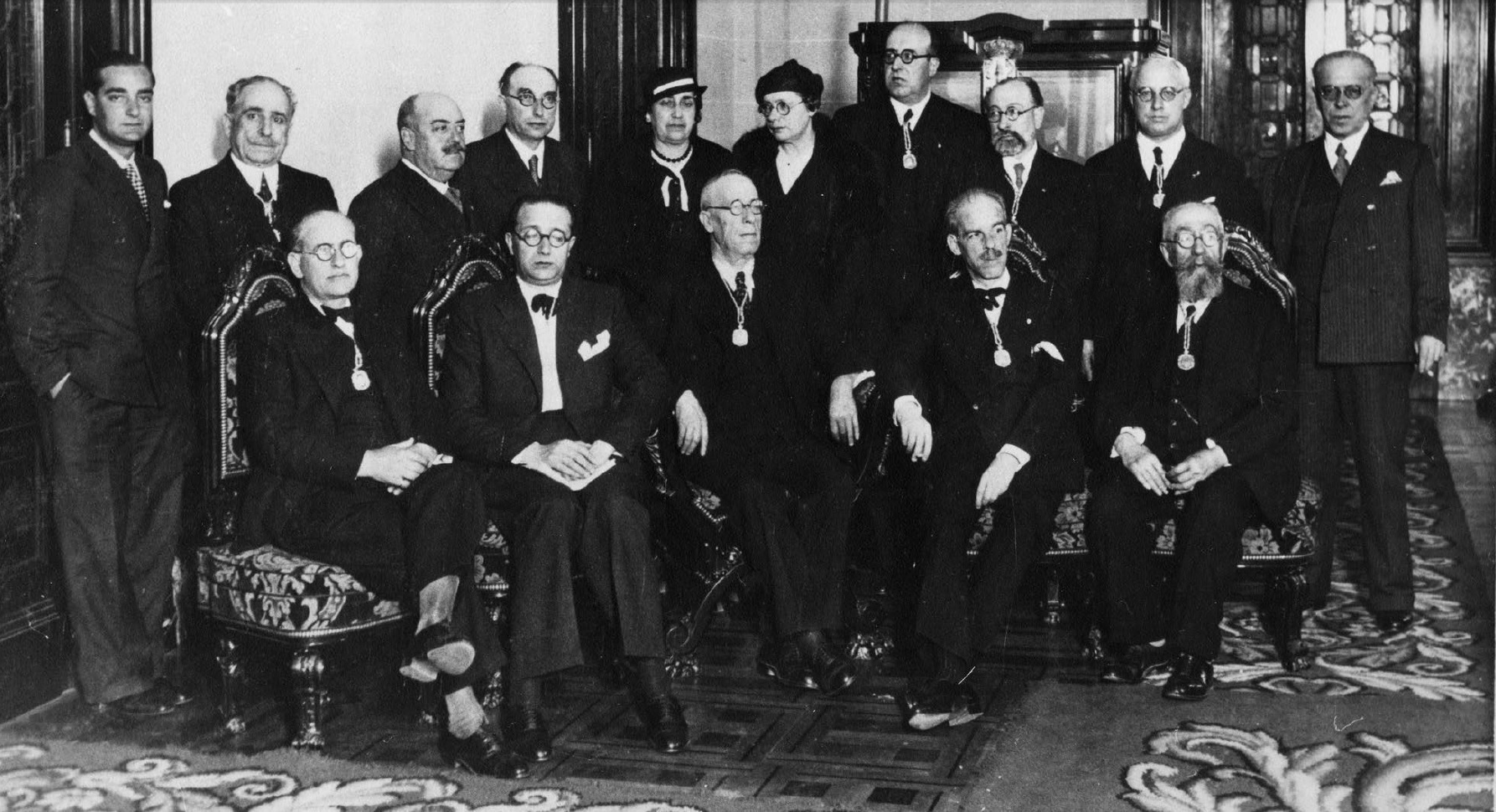
Recepción de Castelao na Real Academia Galega, A Coruña, 25 de xullo de 1934

In 1919, Brañas was a speaker at the First Congress of Galician Studies, organised by the Institute of Galician Studies in La Coruña. Here she stressed the importance of the creation of a marine biological station for the Galician region in La Coruña and discussed the practical means by which it could be established. A year later, she persuaded the Museo Nacional de Ciencias Naturales in Madrid to organise a marine biology course in La Coruña. This course was the precursor to the creation of the Biological Station in Marín, Pontevedra in 1932.

In 1922, she secured a two-month grant from the Junta para Ampliación de Estudios e Investigaciones Científicas(es) to undertake histology practice in the laboratories of the Museo Nacional de Ciencias Naturales (National Museum of Natural Sciences).

She was also a member of the local board of trustees for vocational training in A Coruña.
