= A Coruña =

A Coruña La Coruña (Spanish)
- Municipality
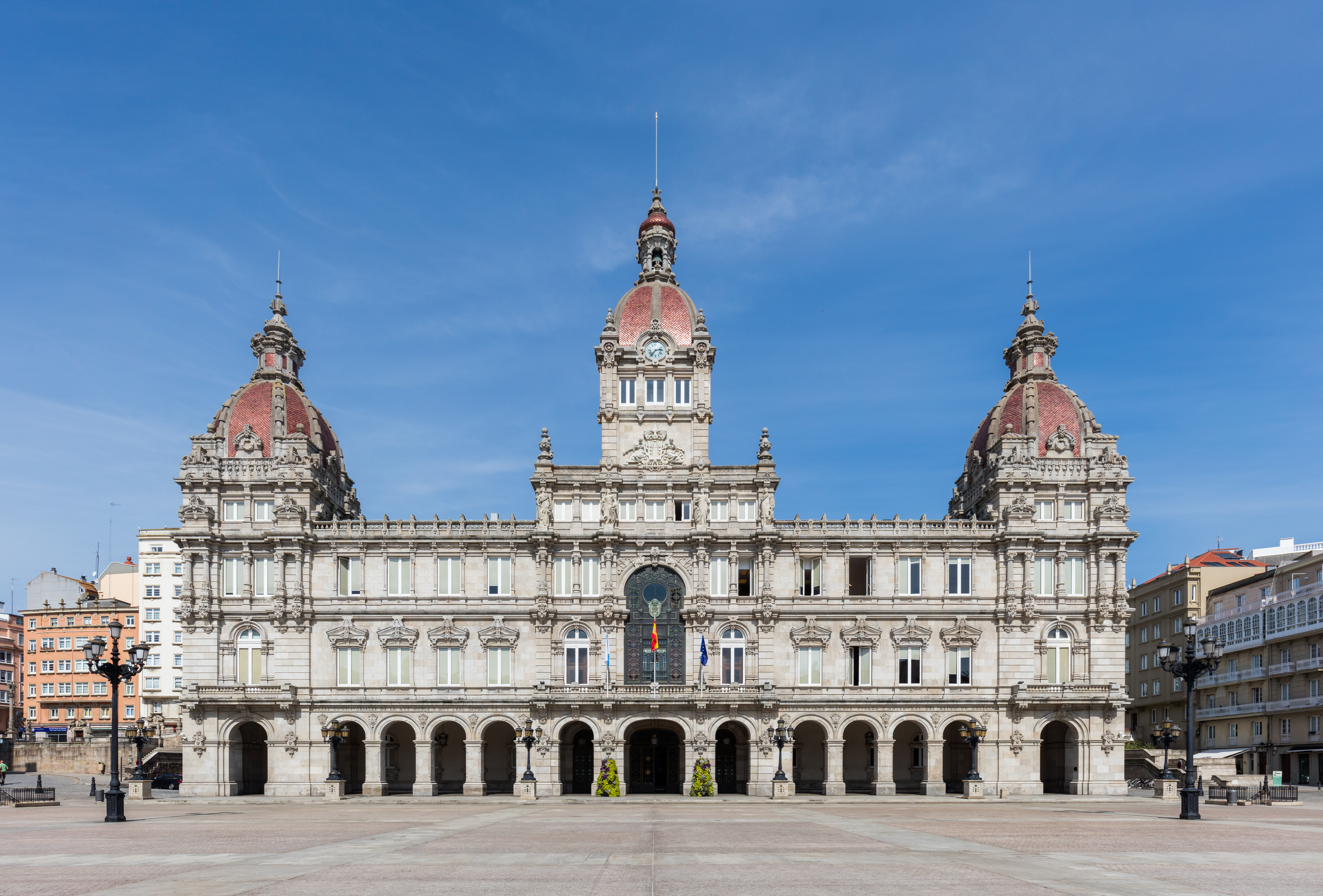
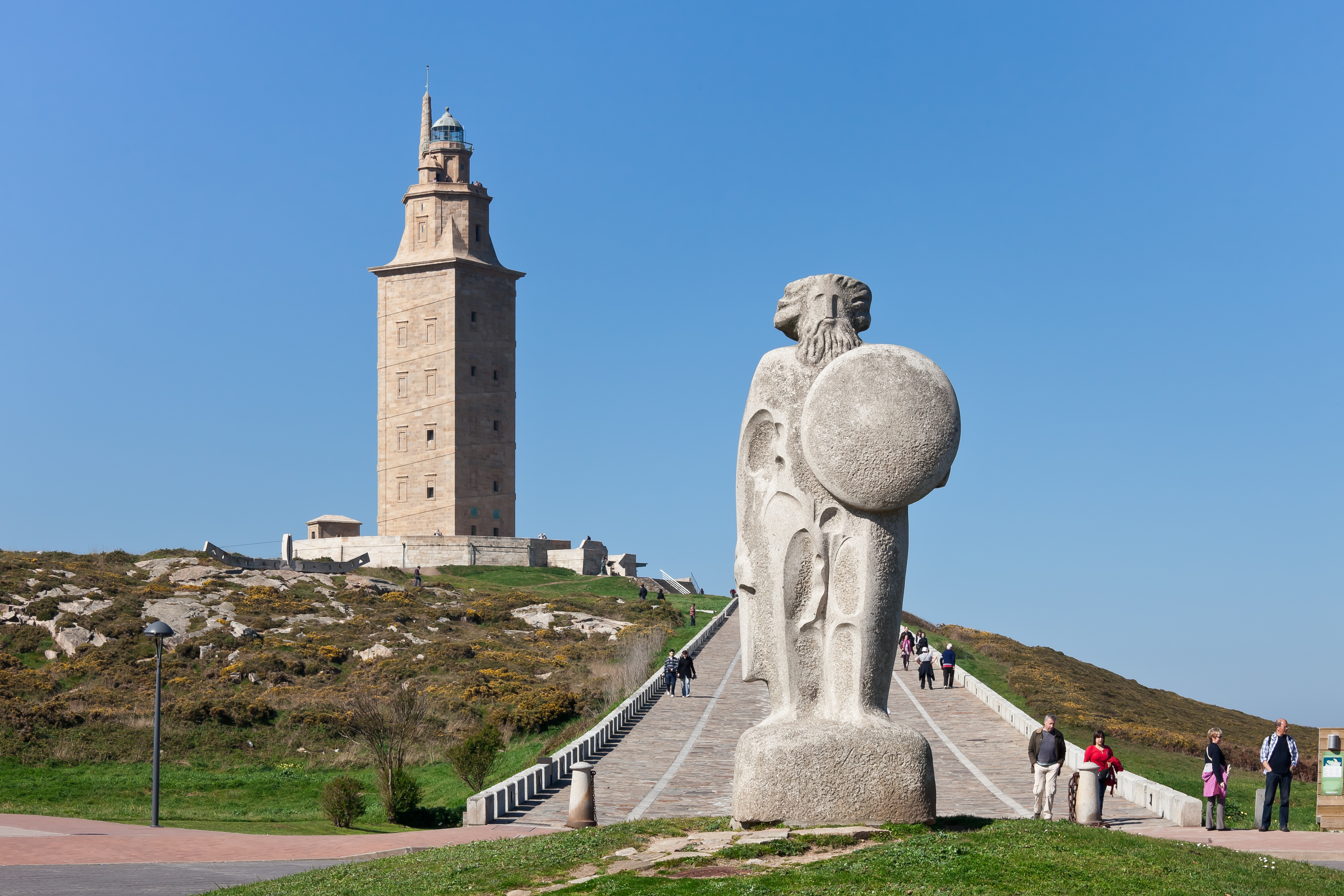
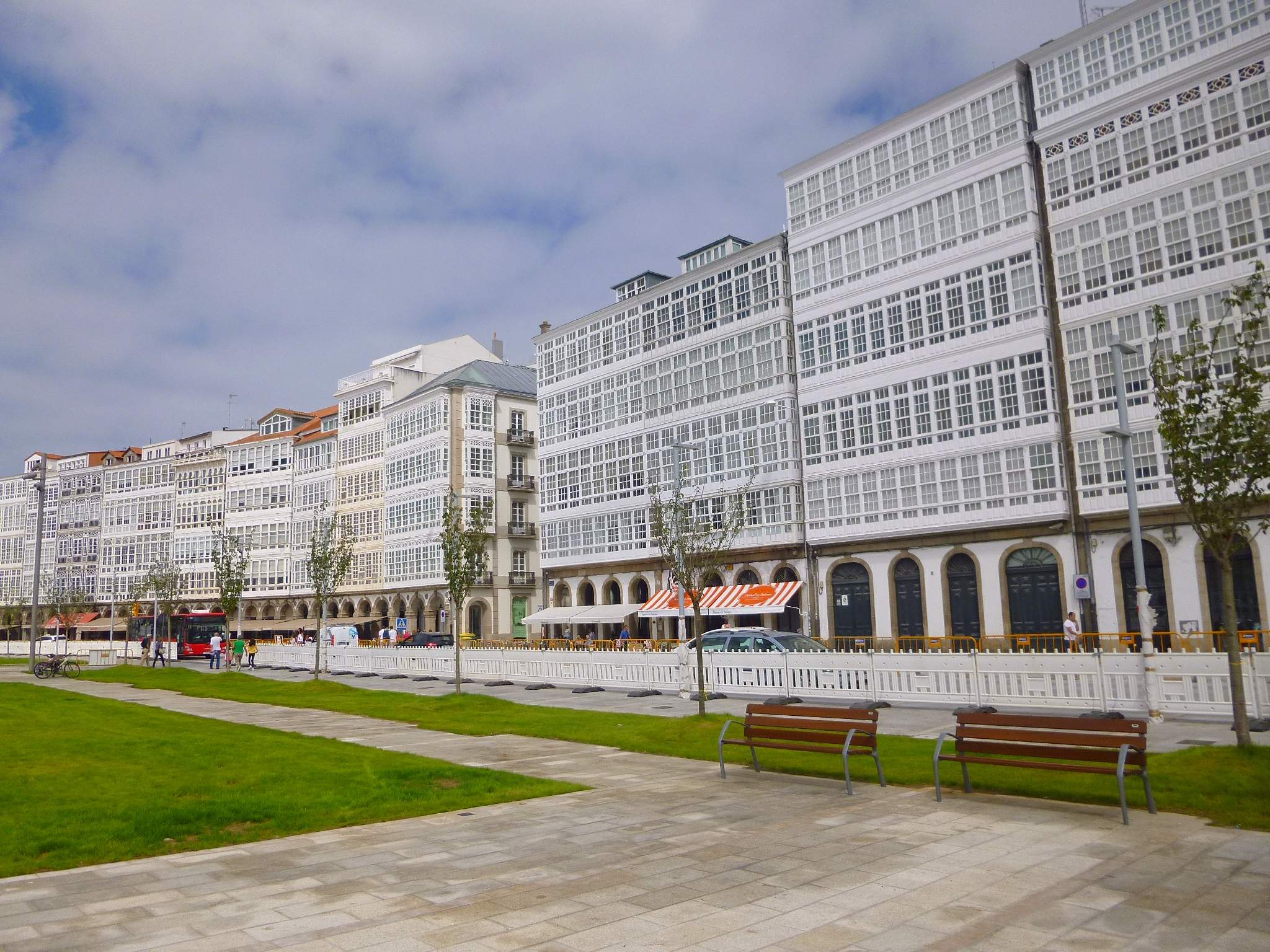
- City hall Tower of Hercules Glass galleries

- Coat of arms
- Nickname: A Cidade de Cristal (The Glass City)
- Motto: A Coruña, a cidade onde ninguén é forasteiro (A Coruña, the city where nobody is an outsider)
- Interactive map of A Coruña
- Location within Galicia Location within Spain
- Coordinates: 43°22′16″N 8°23′46″W
- Country: Spain
- Autonomous community: Galicia
- Province: A Coruña
- Comarca: A Coruña
- Parishes: A Coruña, As Viñas, Elviña, Oza, Visma

Government
  - Type: Ayuntamiento
  - Body: Concello da Coruña
  - Mayor: Inés Rey (PSdeG-PSOE)

Area
  - Total: 38.71 km^{2} (14.95 sq mi)
- Highest elevation (Monte das Arcas): 291 m (955 ft)
- Lowest elevation (Atlantic Ocean): 0 m (0 ft)

Population (2025)
  - Total: 251,277
  - Rank: 18th in Spain; 2nd in Galicia
  - Density: 6,491/km^{2} (16,810/sq mi)
- Demonyms: corunnan (en) coruñés, coruñesa (gl / es)
- Time zone: CET (GMT +1)
  - Summer (DST): CEST (GMT +2)
- Postcode: 15001-15011
- Area codes: +34 981 and +34 881
- INE code: 15074
- Metro GDP: €25.231 billion (2020)
- Website: www.coruna.gal

A Coruña (Galician pronunciation: [ɐ koˈɾuɲɐ]; (Note: English: /ˌlɑː kəˈruːn(j)ə/ LAH kə-ROO-n(y)ə.) in Spanish: La Coruña [la koˈɾuɲa]; also informally called Coruña; historical English: Corunna or The Groyne) is a city and municipality in Galicia, Spain. With a population of 251,277, it is the 2nd-largest city in Galicia behind Vigo. The city is the capital of the Province of A Coruña, having also been the political capital of the Kingdom of Galicia from the 16th to the 19th centuries, and as a regional administrative centre between 1833 and 1982.

A Coruña is located on a promontory in the Golfo Ártabro, a large gulf on the Atlantic Ocean. It is the main industrial and financial centre of northern Galicia, and holds the headquarters of the Universidade da Coruña. A Coruña is the city with the tallest mean-height of buildings in Spain, also featuring a population density of 21,972 inhabitants per square kilometre (56,910/sq mi) of built land area.

== Name ==
There is no clear evidence as to what the name derives from. It seems to be from Crunia, of unknown origin and meaning, documented for the first time at the time of Ferdinand II of León (reigned 1157–1188). As usual in Galician-Portuguese (as well as in Castilian Spanish), the cluster ni naturally evolved into the sound [ɲ], written n, nn or nh in old Galician orthography, nn in Spanish (later abbreviated to ñ, like the original Latin cluster "nn"), and nh in Portuguese and alternative Galician spelling. "A" is the Galician-Portuguese article equivalent to English the.

One proposed etymology derives Crunia from Cluny, the town in France. During its height (c. 950 – c. 1130) the Cluniac religious movement became very prominent in Europe. There is another town named Coruña in Burgos Province.

A more likely possibility is that the name simply means "The Crown", which in Galician is A Coroa. It seems less likely that it traces back to the Galician clunia. The name is reputedly from the Greek Κορώνα (Crown), referring to the crown of Geryon that was buried by Hercules under the lighthouse he built to his honour. The hero Hercules slew the giant tyrant Geryon after three days and three nights of continuous battle. Hercules then—in a Celtic gesture—buried the head of Geryon with his weapons and ordered that a city be built on the site. The lighthouse atop a skull and crossbones representing the buried head of Hercules' slain enemy appears in the coat-of-arms of the city of A Coruña. A folk etymology incorrectly derives Coruña from the ancient columna, or Tower of Hercules.

A proxy evolution within the Portuguese language points to the Latin word Colonya as its origin, where the L was transformed into R which occurs widely in Portuguese. A similar happening can be found today in Coronie, a Surinamese town which also made its course outside the Portuguese system.

In Spain, the official form of the name is now the Galician one: "A Coruña"; although many Spaniards continue to use "La Coruña", its usage is on the decline, in favor of the official and historical form "A Coruña".

=== English use ===
In English, use of the Spanish or Galician forms now predominates. However, the traditional English form Corunna /kəˈrʌnə/ is still often used in the UK, particularly in reference to the Battle of Corunna (1809) in the Peninsular War. Archaically, English-speakers knew the city as "The Groyne", probably from French La Corogne.

== History ==
=== Prehistory ===
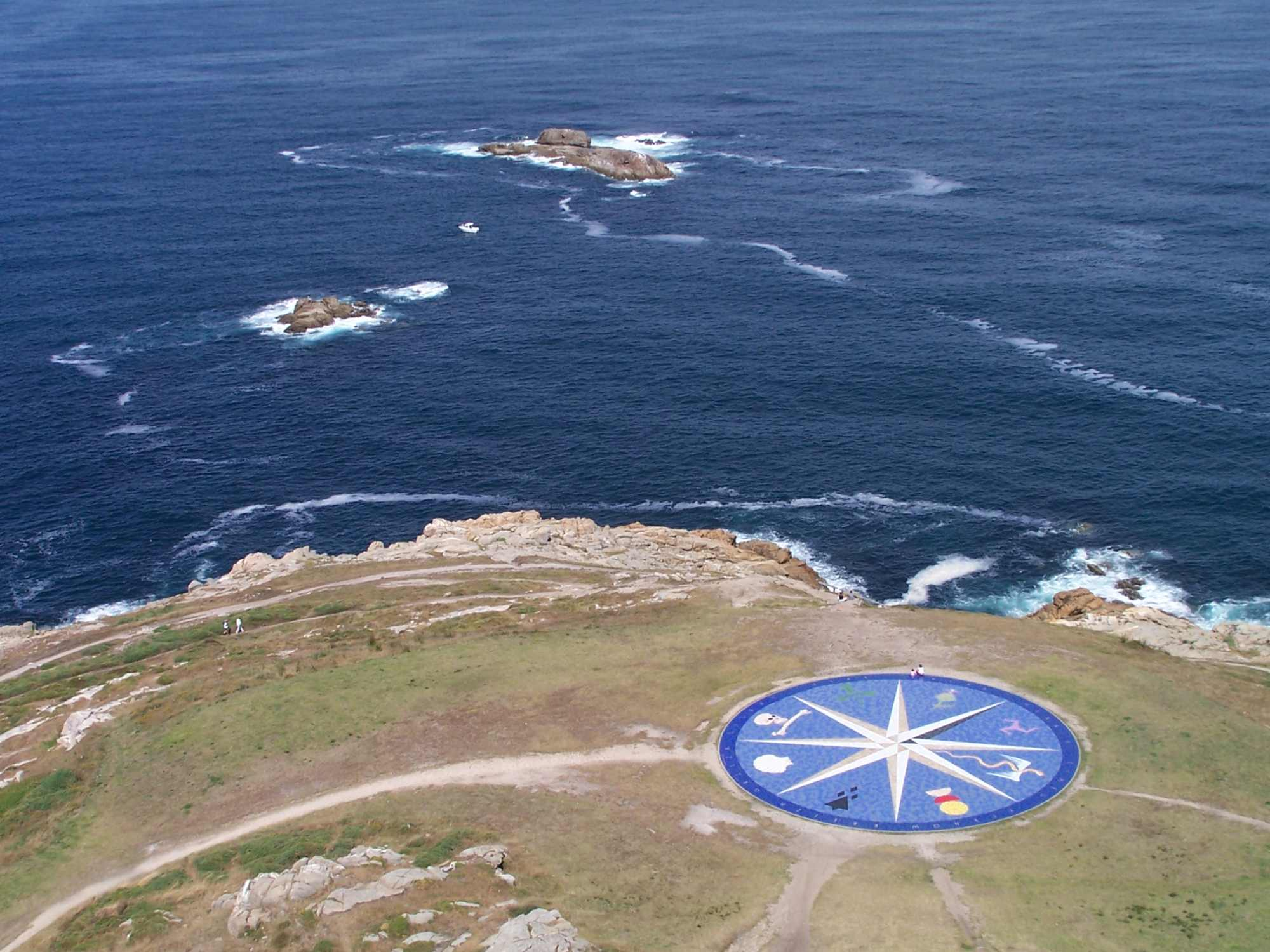
Compass rose representing the different Celtic peoples (near the Tower of Hercules)

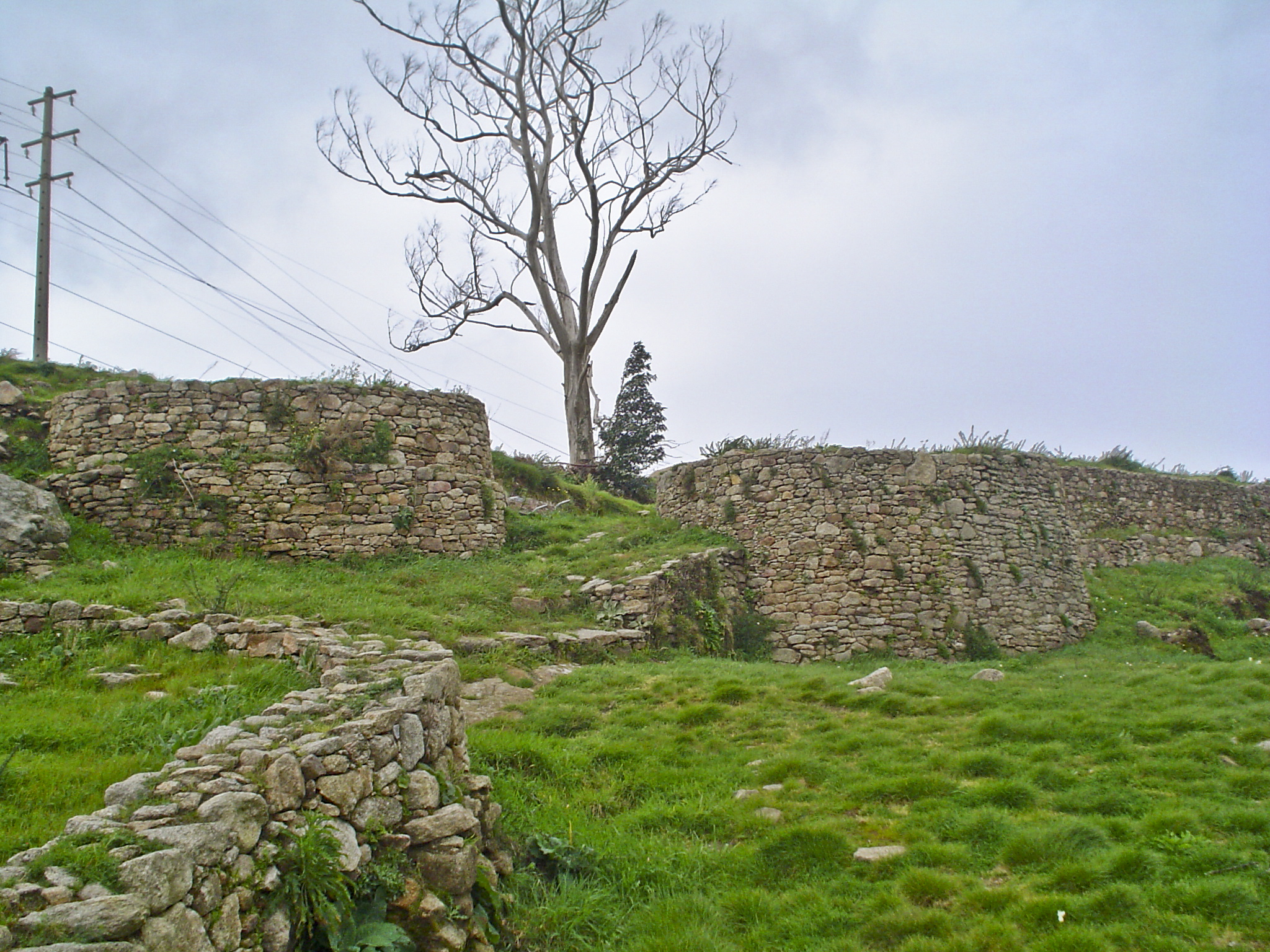
Castro de Elviña, the remnant of a Celtic military structure in A Coruña

A Coruña spread from the peninsula, the site of the later Tower of Hercules, onto the mainland. The oldest part, known popularly in Galician as Cidade Vella (Old City), Cidade Alta (High City) or the Cidade (City), is built on an ancient Celtic castro. It was supposedly inhabited by the Brigantes and Artabrians, the Celtic tribes of the area.

=== Roman times ===
The Romans came to the region in the 2nd century BCE; they made the most of the strategic position and soon the city became quite important in maritime trade. In 62 BCE Julius Caesar came to the city (known at the time as Brigantium) in pursuit of the metal trade, establishing commerce with what are now France, England and Portugal. The town began to grow, mainly during the 1st and 2nd centuries (when the Farum Brigantium Tower of Hercules was built), but declined after the 4th century and particularly with the incursions of the Vikings, which forced the population to flee towards the interior of the Estuary of O Burgo.

=== Middle Ages ===
After the fall of the Roman Empire, A Coruña still had a commercial port connected to foreign countries, but contacts with the Mediterranean were slowly replaced by a more Atlantic-oriented focus. The process of deurbanisation that followed the fall of the Roman Empire also affected A Coruña. Between the 7th and 8th centuries, the city was no more than a little village of labourers and sailors.

The 11th-century Chronica iriense names Faro do Burgo (ancient name of A Coruña) as one of the dioceses that king Miro granted to the episcopate of Iria Flavia in the year 572:

Mirus Rex Sedi suae Hiriensi contulit Dioceses, scilicet Morratium, Salinensem, (...) Bregantinos, Farum...

"[King Miro granted to his Irienses headquarters the dioceses of Morrazo, Salnés (...). Bergantiños, Faro...]"

The Muslim invasion of the Iberian peninsula left no archaeological evidence in the northwest, so it cannot be said whether or not the Muslim invaders ever reached the city. As Muslim rule in early 8th century Galicia consisted little more than a short-lived overlordship of the remote and rugged region backed by a few garrisons, and the city was no more than a village amidst Roman ruins, the invaders showed the same lack of interest in the ruined city as they did generally for the region.

As the city began to recover during the Middle Ages the main problem for the inhabitants was the Norman raids, as well as the ever-present threat of raids (razzias) from Al-Andalus to the south. During the 9th century there were several Viking attacks on the city, called at that time Faro or Faro Bregancio.

In the year 991, King Vermudo II began the construction of defensive military positions on the coast. At Faro, in the ruins of the Tower of Hercules, a fortress was built, which had a permanent military garrison. To pay for it, he gave power over the city to the bishop of Santiago. The bishop of Santiago became the most important political post in Galicia, and remained so until the 15th century.

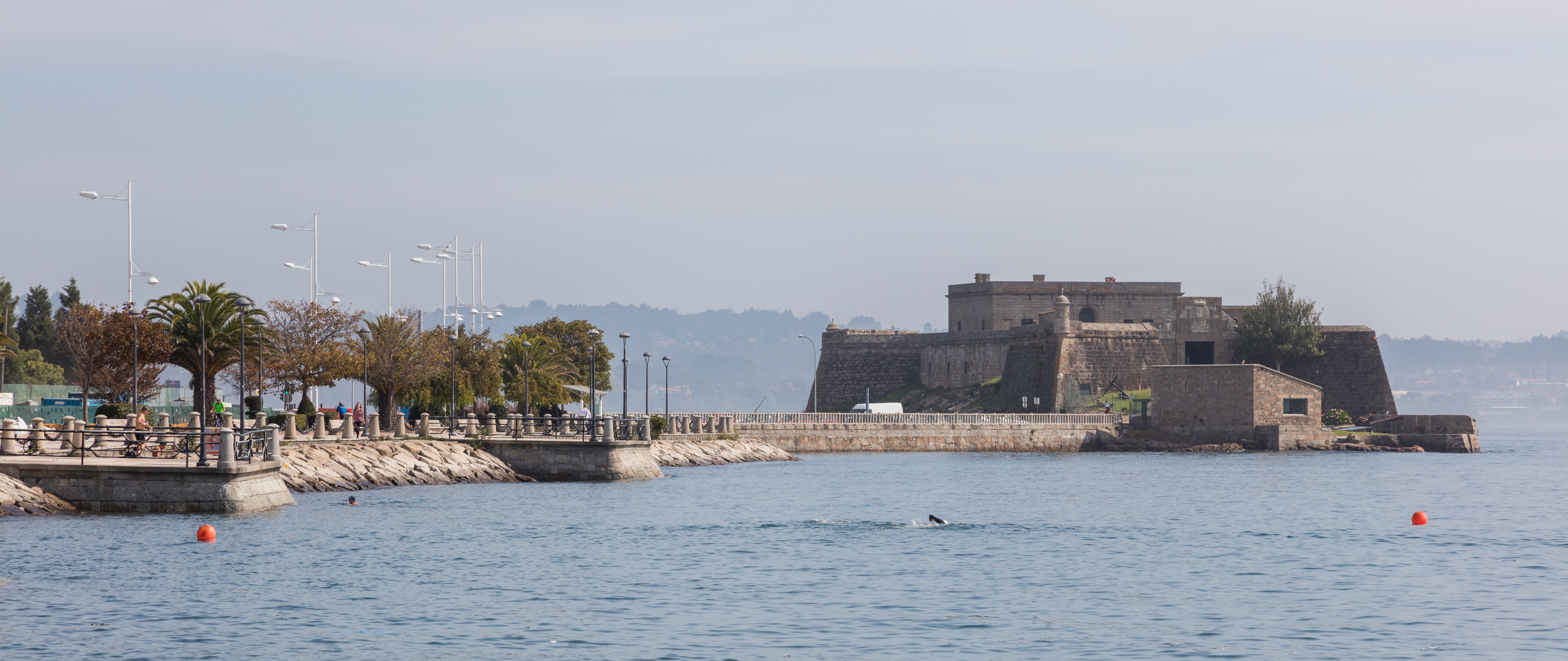
San Antón Castle

In 1208, Alfonso IX re-founded the city of Crunia. Some privileges, such as those of disembarking and selling salt without paying taxes, were granted to the city, and it enjoyed a big growth in fishing and mercantile business. The city grew and extended through the isthmus. In 1446 John II of Castile granted to A Coruña the title of "City". The Catholic Monarchs established the Royal Audience of the Kingdom of Galicia in the city, instead of Santiago. A Coruña also became the headquarters of the Captaincy General.

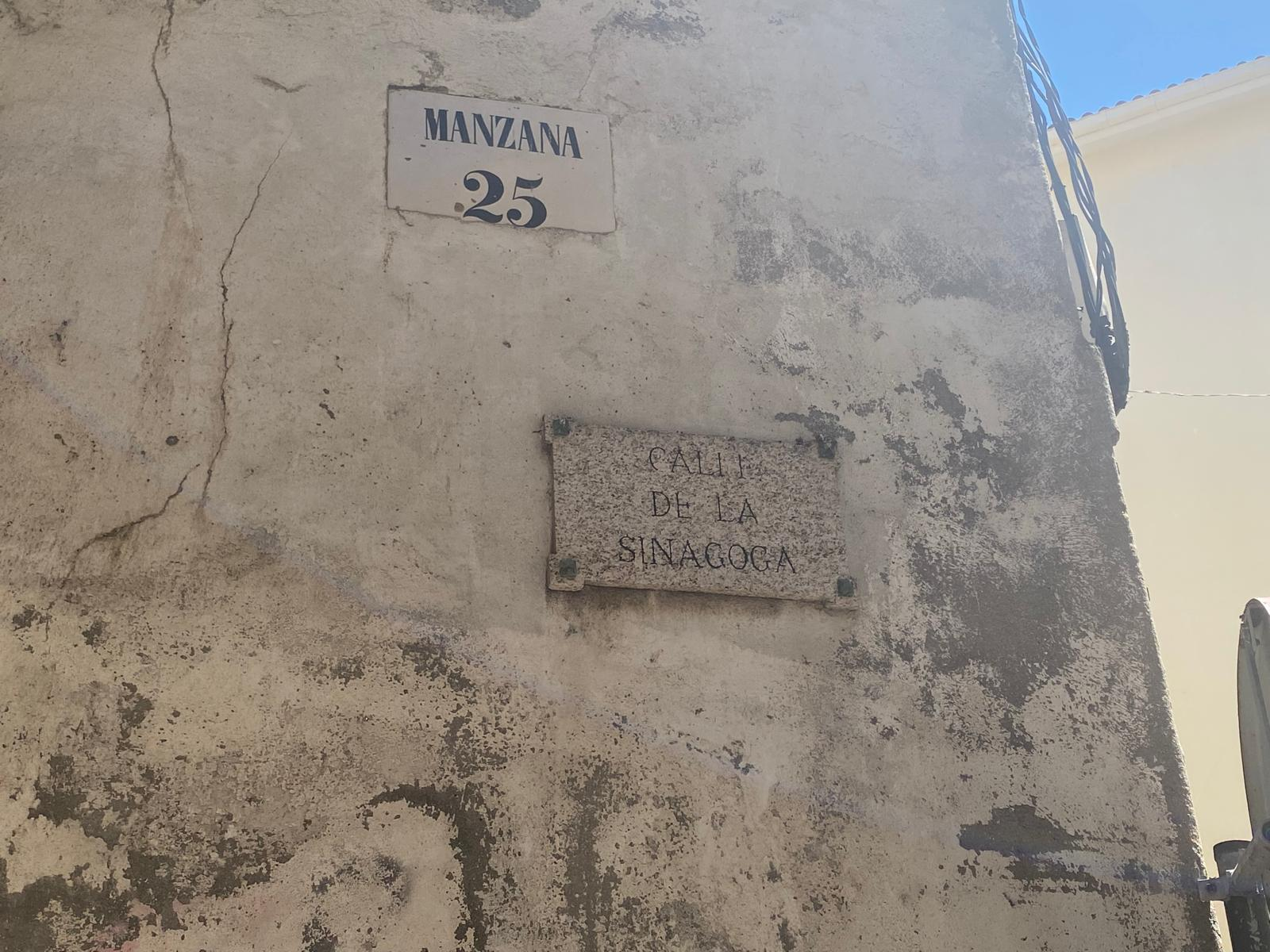
"Calle de la sinagoga" or "synagogue street" in A Coruña.

Later, in 1522, Charles V conceded to the city of A Coruña the license to establish the House of Spices, being this the port chosen by Jofre Garcia de Loysa to set his expedition to conquer the Moluccans.

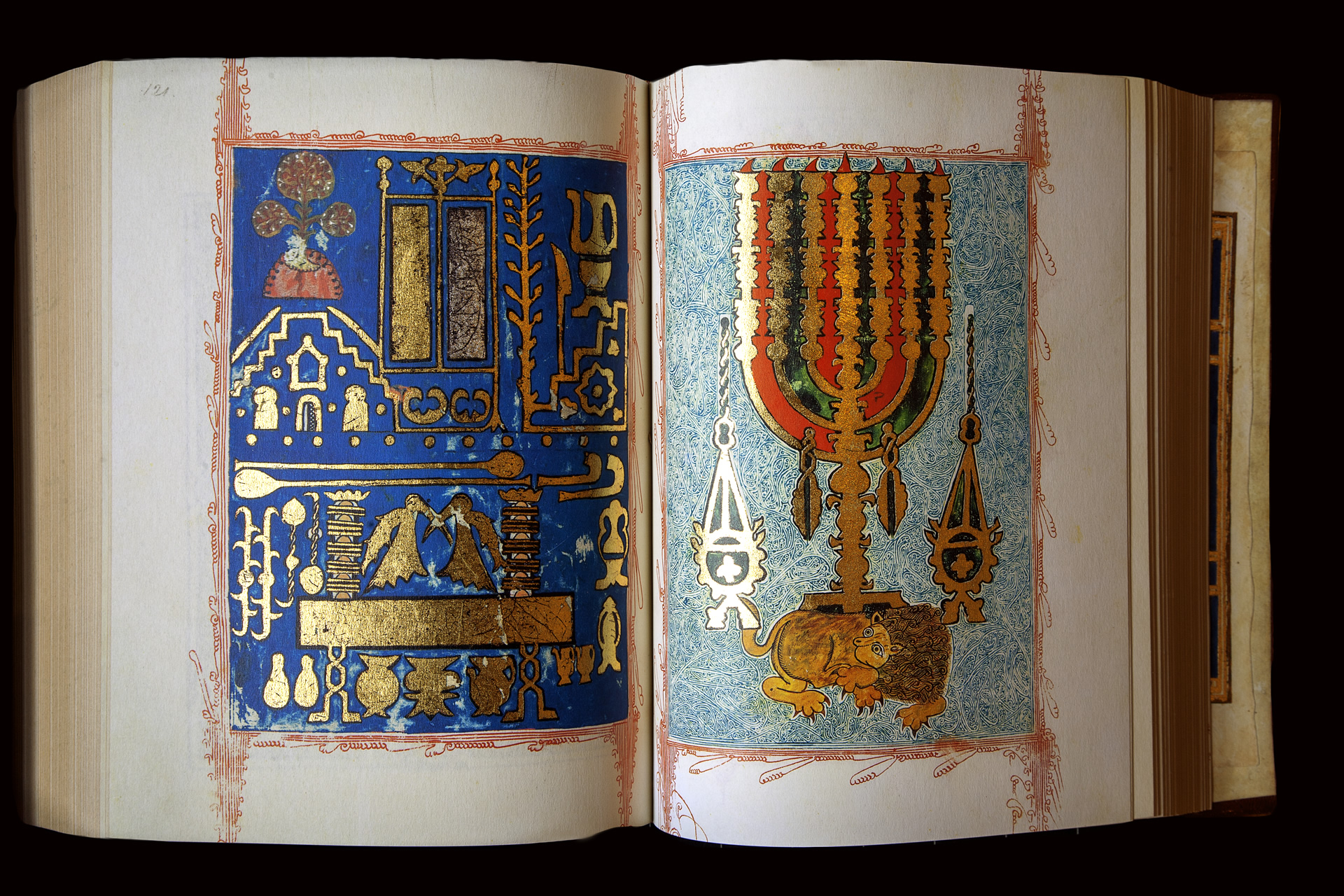
The Kennicott Bible, completed in A Coruña.

In the late Middle Ages, before the expulsion of the Jews in 1492, a thriving Jewish community created a rich artistic heritage in the city. The most lavishly illuminated Hebrew Bible in medieval Spain was created in A Coruña in 1476. Known as the Kennicott Bible, it is currently housed in the Bodleian Library, Oxford. The Jewish community is said to have dated to at least the 11th century, with fragments of Jewish tombstones dating to that time period. There is a street in present A Coruña called "Calle de la Sinagoga", or "synagogue street", which is believed to be the street where the synagogue once stood.

=== Modern period ===
During the Modern period, the city was a port and centre for the manufacturing of textiles. In 1520, king Carlos I of Spain, met in the courts of A Coruña and embarked from its harbor to be elected Emperor of the Holy Roman Empire (as Charles V). He allowed the government of the Kingdom of Galicia to distribute spice in Europe between 1522 and 1529. Commerce with the Indies was allowed between 1529 and 1575. San Antón Castle was built to defend of the city and its harbor.

The city of A Coruña became the seat of the government bodies generated by the new political system imposed by the Catholic Monarchs. Charles V granted A Coruña the long-awaited House of Trade. While most of the cities of Galicia contracted during the 16TH -19TH centuries, A Coruña periodically refreshed (its closely linked to the Court) social class, honored by it with appointments, leading to a continuous enhancement of social life. The port of A Coruña became the base of the Navy, as the city continued to become the main port of Galicia due to its good situation regarding access to North America (positioned as a key port for the European Atlantic trade) its business tradition, and its status as a royal city with privileges from the King. The city fought hard for centuries to obtain the licenses it needed to trade with the entire world.

From the port of Ferrol in the Province of A Coruña, Philip II left to marry Mary I of England in 1554, and much later, in 1588, from the same port the Spanish Armada would set sail to the Low Countries and England, where it was defeated.

In the following year, during the Anglo-Spanish War, the English Armada conducted a besieged A Coruña, but was eventually forced to withdraw. A local woman, María Pita, took her dead husband's spear during the siege and killed an enemy captain, rallying support to deny a breach in the wall to the attackers.

In the 16th and 17th centuries, the wars of the Spanish monarchy caused a great increase in taxes and the start of conscription. In 1620, Philip III created the School of the Boys of the Sea. In 1682 the Tower of Hercules was restored by Antúnez.

=== Seventeenth century ===
In the seventeenth and eighteenth centuries, continuous wars caused tax increases and the reduction of the population, sending the city into recession.

Queen Elizabeth I of England’s deep enmity with Spanish King Phillip II led to a series of wars. On 21 July 1588, the Spanish Armada left the port of A Coruña for the unexpected disaster of total defeat in the English Channel. A year later, in 1589, the Queen of England sent a counter armada commanded by Admiral Francis Drake to siege the city. The city’s defense was organized under the command of the Marquis of Cerralbo, who deployed all available troops and militias and mobilized the population for support work, including the reinforcement of the old medieval walls. During the siege, the heroic deed of María Pita took place: at a critical moment, when an explosion knocked down part of the wall near the Puerta de Ares and the soldiers on both sides were stunned, she rallied the defenders and took up arms, facing the enemy with "Whoever has honor should follow me!" This brave gesture resulted in the upper city (today known as the old city) not falling into English hands. María Pita received great recognition and important privileges for her action.

During the siege, the people of A Coruña made a vow to the Virgin of the Rosary, praying for the salvation of the city, the origin of a tradition that is preserved to this day and is celebrated every 7 October in the church of Santo Domingo. The fierce and successful defense of A Coruña enshrined street names that persist, such as the Marquis of Cerralbo, Captain Troncoso (next to the section of wall he defended) and Captain Juan Varela.

Despite the defense of A Coruña, the English managed to land at several points and cause damage. They burned the monastery of Santo Domingo, the neighborhood of Santo Tomás, and looted the area of Pescadería (current Calle de San Andrés and its surroundings), where they fought house to house, forcing its inhabitants to take refuge in the upper city. Reinforcements from Betanzos, commanded by the Count of Andrade, from Ferrol and from Santiago de Compostela, sent by its Archbishop, caused Drake and Norris to withdraw with their fleet on 19 May. He suffered heavy losses, failed to take the upper city, and failed to achieve his next objectives of conquering Lisbon and the Azores, resulting in the loss of Queen Elizabeth I's favor.

It was at this time that the Royal Court was transferred from Santiago de Compostela to A Coruña. In 1620, Philip III created the School of the Boys of the Sea. In 1682 restoration work was carried out on the Tower of Hercules, as directed by the architect Antúnez.

=== Eighteenth century ===
In the War of the Spanish Succession, the city again suffered a rise in taxes and the conscription of the population. The war ended in 1716 and the economic recovery began with the production and export activities of the Catalan bourgeois businessmen based in the city.

=== Building of the Maritime and Terrestrial Consulate ===
The Maritime Terrestrial Consulate was built in 1785 with the aim of promoting navigation and commercial relations, boosting port infrastructure, fostering sources of wealth and ensuring merchants and industrialists their own court that would free them from the obstacles and procedural parsimony of the ordinary courts, which were absolutely ineffective in the face of a new economic reality. The Consulate became a fundamental institution for the future development of the city, as it did not limit its activity to the strictly commercial, industrial and procedural spheres by founding a Nautical School, a School of Commerce, and a School of Drawing. Its economic contribution is evident in the works planned by the City Council for improving the city’s economy. It is the court of primary authority for the resolution of commercial disputes, the maintenance and improvement of navigation (repair of port facilities, new navigational aids, and related infrastructure), promotion of wealth in Galicia, support for Galician production, and introduction of new technology.

During the reign of Charles III, the monopoly of Cádiz as the only city with permission to trade with the colonies in America was broken. Thirteen ports, including that of A Coruña, would benefit from this trade, allowing mail and transport with the American colonies, connecting with cities such as Havana, San Juan, Veracruz, Panama City, Cartagena de Indias, Maracaibo, Caracas, Buenos Aires or Montevideo; as well as with Europe. From that moment on, the city stood out economically. The King ordered the construction of the wall of Pescadería (including the breakwater that still divides the beaches of Riazor and Orzán). The first industrial activities began in the city with the creation of the Royal Tobacco Factory (in operation until December of 2002) and the Royal Hat shop of A Coruña.

=== 19th century ===
On 30 November 1803, an expedition led by Francisco Javier Balmis left for America to spread the smallpox vaccine discovered several years earlier.

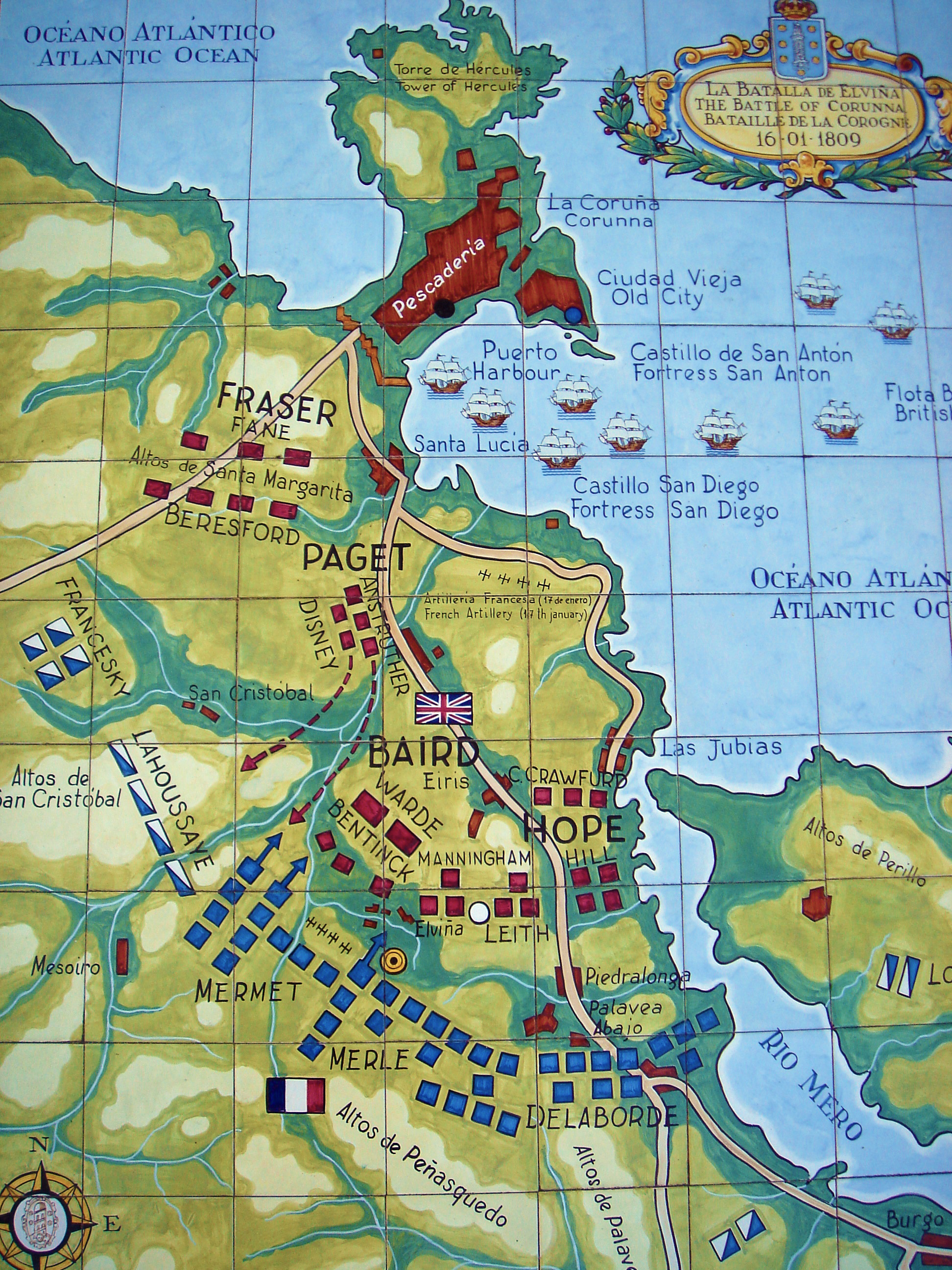
Mosaic map to commemorate the Battle of Elviña. The yellow dot shows the location of the mosaic.

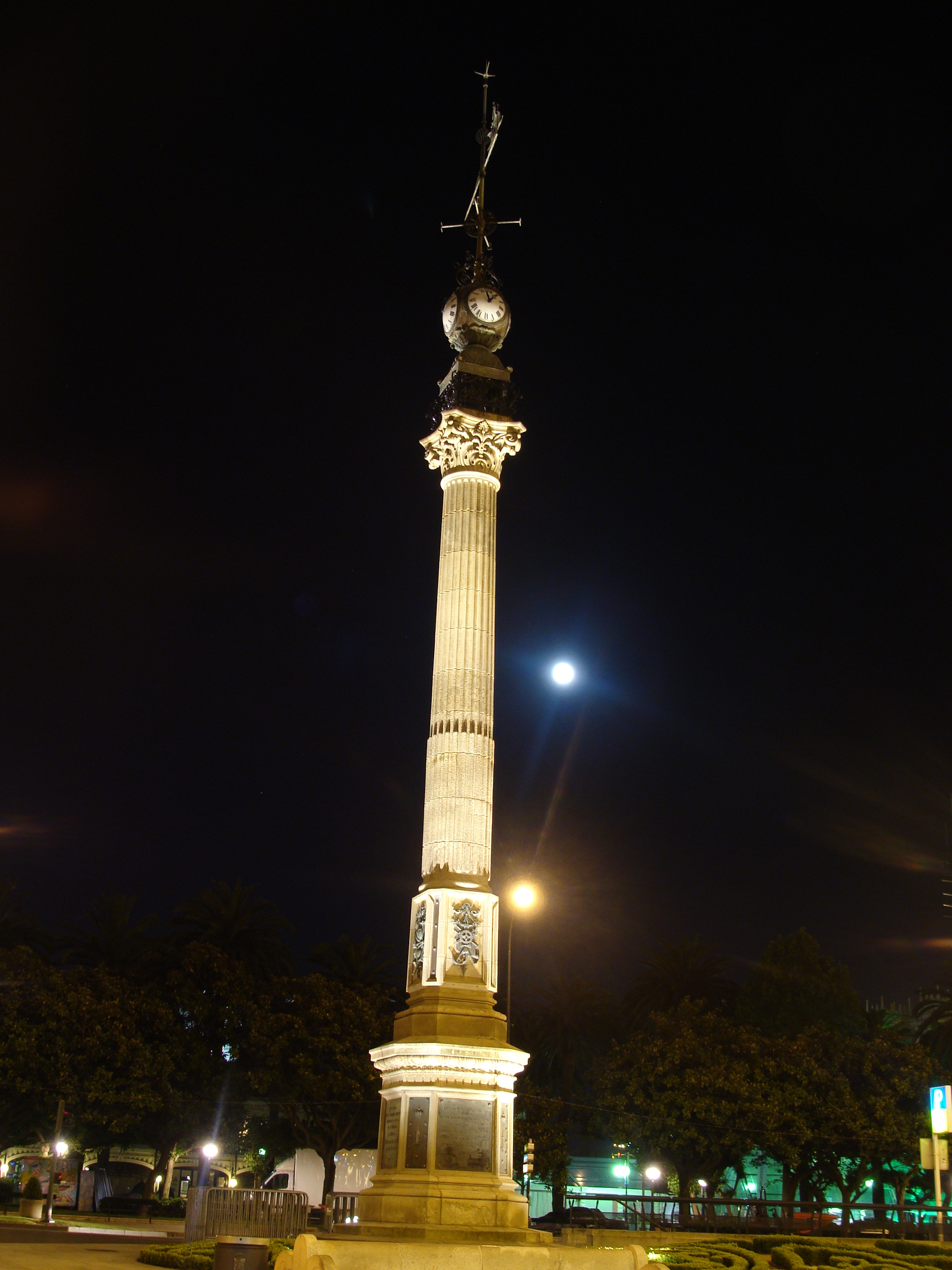
The Obelisk, dedicated to Don Aureliano Linares Rivas in 1895

On 16 January 1809, A Coruña was the site of the Battle of Corunna during the Peninsular War, in which British troops fought against the French to cover the embarkation of British troops after their retreat. In this battle General Sir John Moore was killed.

Spanish resistance during the war in Galicia was led by Sinforiano López, and A Coruña was the only Galician city that achieved success against the French troops. French troops left Galicia at the end of May 1809.

Regarding the economy, in 1804 the Royal Tobacco Factory was founded, and there the workers' movement of the city had its origins. During the 19th century other businesses (glass, foundries, textiles, gas, matches, etc.) were slowly established, but it was maritime trade and migrant travel that attracted Catalan, Belgian, French and English investments. The Bank of La Coruña was founded in 1857. The new provincial division of 1832 also influenced economic development.

In the first half of the nineteenth century the city experienced a notable increase in population, increasing from 12,000 inhabitants to about 20,000 by 1850.

=== War for Independence ===
During the Napoleonic occupation in May 1808, the city, led by Sinforiano López, resisted the French from the beginning. A patriotic uprising began on 30 May, when the crowd, inspired by news of the general uprising from neighboring provinces, demanded that the Spanish flag be raised and that the artillery salutes be made, as per tradition on the Day of San Fernando and in the name day of King Ferdinand VII. Captain General Don Antonio Filangieri had tried to calm the patriots, but they headed for his palace with malice. Interviewed with a delegation, Filangieri relented to their pressure and escaped through a secondary door and took refuge in the convent of Santo Domingo. A defense authority was formed here, as in other important cities in Spain, positioning A Coruña on the patriot side at war with the French.

Several confrontations with the French were fought in and around A Coruña, the most significantly the battle of Elviña on 16 January 1809, between the French and English. The battle itself was only a skirmish, as the English were preparing their fleet anchored in the harbor and to abandon the city to its fate. The next day the French seized the city, which they abandoned nine months later to pursue the Marquis de la Estrela and his five thousand men. The casualties caused by the Galician militia and guerrillas prevented Marshal Soult from retaking the city. It forced him to abandon Galicia with more than 50% casualties.

During the 19th century, the city was the centre of anti-monarchist sentiment. On 19 August 1815, Field Marshal Juan Díaz Porlier, nicknamed "the little Count", pronounced himself as authority to restore the Spanish Constitution of 1812 in opposition to King Fernando VII, supported by the bourgeoisie and the intelligentsia of A Coruña. However, on 22 August he was betrayed, captured and taken to the castle of San Antón, where he was sentenced to death and executed by hanging in the Campo de la Leña, now Plaza de España, on 3 October 1815. A Coruña supported the liberal side in all the 19th-century rebellions, and played an important role in the Rexurdimento.

=== Carlist Wars ===
When in 1833 Spain broke out in the first of the Carlist wars, A Coruña, faithful to its liberal spirit, proclaimed its support for the Elizabethan cause. The city was surrounded on several occasions by Carlist expeditions without ever being occupied by the troops of the child king Don Carlos. After the end of the conflict, Queen Isabella II rewarded the city by granting it the status of provincial capital in 1849.

=== Late nineteenth century ===
At the end of the nineteenth century, new industries and banks began to settle in the city and laid the foundations of the modern city. At that time, illustrious figures such as Emilia Pardo Bazán or Aureliano Linares Rivas (deputy for the Liberal Party) brought prestige to the city and granted important economic donations in difficult times for the population of A Coruña.

After the loss of the last Spanish colonies in the Spanish-American War of 1898, many Galicians who had created their fortune in the Caribbean, referred to locally as "indianos", returned with their money and the desire to recreate the luxury they had known in cities such as Havana or Santiago de Cuba.

=== 20th and 21st centuries ===
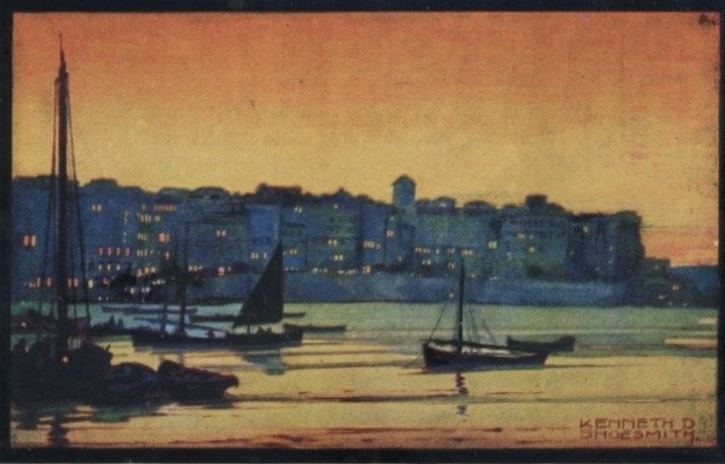
Sunset on the harbour in the 1920s

At the beginning of the 20th century, A Coruña had about 45,000 inhabitants. The Great Depression and the Spanish Civil War severely affected the economy through the 1930s to the mid-1950s. The 1960s and early 1970s saw a dramatic economic recovery, which was part of the wider Spanish Miracle. As elsewhere in Galicia, A Coruña attracted a massive influx of Galician-speaking rural dwellers, into their quickly developed neighbourhoods. The period between 1960 and 1980 saw a big transformation in most areas of the city from being agricultural dwellings to urban districts. The international oil shocks of the mid and late 1970s severely disrupted the economy, causing many bankruptcies and high unemployment until the mid-1980s, when slower but steady economic development was resumed. In the twentieth century there was a demographic and economic explosion, highlighted by the annexation of the municipality of Oza on 28 January 1912, which increased the municipality by more than 70% of its previous territory. More industry was created, the port was strengthened, trade union organizations were founded and the city's business and service network increased.

A Coruña became the capital of Galician architectural avant-garde at the beginning of the century with the construction of buildings of modernist-style facades. Many survive around the Plaza de Lugo, Plaza de Orense, Linares Rivas, Plaza de Pontevedra, in addition to the emblematic buildings of the Kiosco Alfonso, Radio Nacional de España and the since-demolished Hotel Atlántico). The Galician Royal Academy was founded in 1906 and the Brotherhoods of the Galician Language in 1916. Between 1922 and 1929 it had the tallest building in Spain in the headquarters of Banco Pastor, located in the Canton Pequeño. The following year, this company inaugurated the headquarters on Calle San Andrés, designed by the architect José María de la Vega Samper, another example of the influence of commercial architecture of American origin.

==== Elections of 1931 ====
In the Spanish general elections, 1931, all the political parties knew that the electoral results had important political consequences. The campaign of Unión Monárquica was very important in A Coruña and was supported by El Ideal Gallego. Republicans and socialists constituted a block, made up of the Organización Republicana Gallega Autónoma (ORGA), independent republicans, the Spanish Socialist Workers' Party (PSOE) and the Radical Socialist Republican Party (PRRS).

In the elections, the republican parties obtained 34 of the 39 council seats. The best results were of the ORGA and of the PRRS, and the Radical Republican Party lost support.

=== Second Republic (1931-1936) ===
The municipal elections of 12 April 1931, yielded overwhelming results in favor of the republicans; the FRG-AGRO (Galician Republican Federation - Autonomous Galician Republican Organization) coalition, founded among others by Santiago Casares Quiroga, a lawyer and politician from A Coruña, obtained 31 seats, in addition to 2 independent republican seats not integrated into the federation, and one socialist seat, as compared to six monarchist seats. With the Second Spanish Republic, the city continued its economic and political expansion. During this time architectural rationalism (construction of apartment buildings with concrete) was introduced, and spurred from 1935 the establishment of new neighborhoods in the city, such as Os Mallos, As Atochas-Monte Alto and Santa Margarita.

During the Second Republic education was recognized as essential, and various educational projects were promoted throughout Spain, including A Coruña. The city's desire to host higher education facilities was first expressed in the nineteenth century. The municipal government initiated a project to build a university city in 1934, based on an urban proposal drawn up by the architect Antonio Tenreiro, but the project stalled during the Spanish Civil War. The school city was realized after the war in 1947. An architectural complex typical of the thirties is currently used as an institute, study classroom and naval school.

Anti-religious violence, carried out by minority sectors of A Coruña society, which spread throughout Spain, also affected the city. On the afternoon of 2 July 1931, the buildings of the Jesuits and the Marists were stoned, and the Capuchin church was set on fire, after a meeting of the Local Workers' Federation intended to protest the resumption of worship in that temple. The intervention of the Civil Guard prevented the same vandalism from happening in the Dominican convent. On 12 September 1933, a bomb exploded causing little damage at the back door of St. Andrew's Church. Also in 1933 the parish church of San Vicente de Elviña was set on fire. On 21 February 1936, fires were extinguished in the Collegiate Church of Santa María, in the churches of the Jesuits and the Third Order and the chapel of the Redemptorists. There were also attempts to set fire to the churches of San Roque and the residence of the Josephine nuns.

=== Civil War (1936-1939) ===
In 1936 the Civil War broke out. The army commanders who supported the military coup immediately took control of the city. From that moment on, and after a bloody repression during which there is evidence of executions in the Campo de la Rata, La Coruña ceased to be a bastion of federal republicanism. The military governor and the captain general were transferred to Ferrol, where they were subsequently executed by firing squad after a court martial for the crime of refusing to join the uprising.

=== Dictatorship of Franco (1939-1975) ===
During the dictatorship of Francisco Franco, Mayor Alfonso Molina stands out. During his time in office, an arterial high speed road to the city center bearing his name was completed in 1957. The businessman Pedro Barrié de la Maza, a sympathizer of the regime, founded important companies such as Unión Fenosa.

During the economic development of the 1960s, the city began to experience a great population increase, receiving 60,000 new inhabitants in just a decade, due to a wave of immigration from the rural regions expanding the city to the west and south when the new neighborhoods such as Los Mallos and Agra del Orzán were built.

In 1975, the Hercón Tower (also known as the Costa Rica Tower) was erected, changing the character of the city to feature buildings greater than ten stories, an attribute unusual for Spanish cities. It remains the tallest building in northern Spain at 108 meters tall (119m including the antenna of Televisión de Galicia (TVG), headquartered in the same building).

==== Return to democracy ====
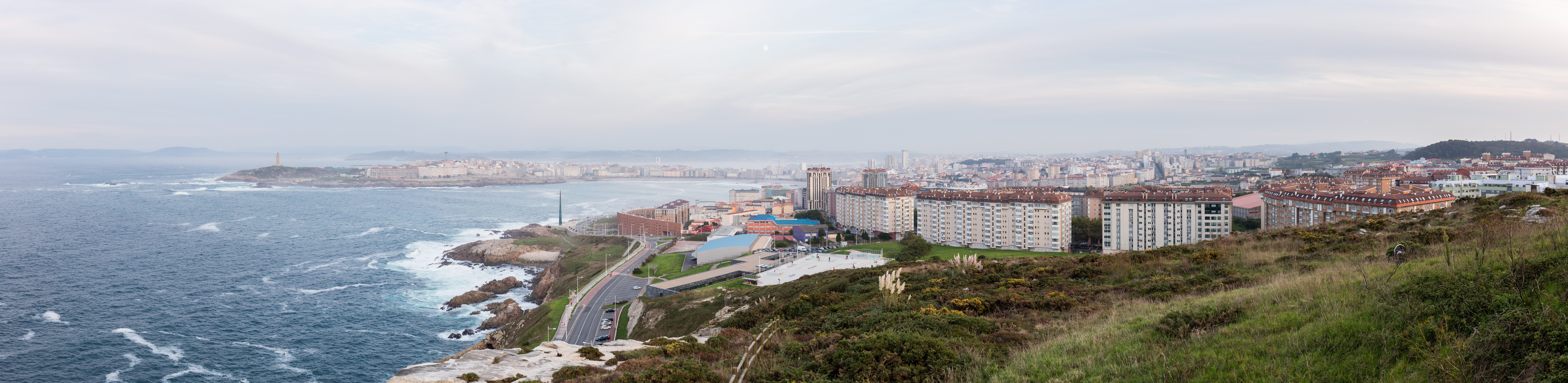
Panoramic view of the city from St Peter's Mountain

Once in democracy, the Statute of Autonomy of Galicia was adopted in 1981, and A Coruña lost the capital of Galicia, held since 1563, to Santiago de Compostela. This event provoked the largest protest demonstration in the history of the city.

During the time in office of the socialist mayor Francisco Vázquez Vázquez (1983-2006), who was elected to six consecutive terms by an absolute majority, the city undertook ambitious urban development projects, the most emblematic of which were the construction of a large promenade of twelve kilometers around the city (the longest in Europe) and the three scientific museums:

• The House of Sciences (which includes a planetarium).

• The Domus, formerly called House of Man (the only museum in the world dedicated monographically to the human being).

• The Finisterrae Aquarium, formerly called House of Fish. The =MC² network (Scientific Museums of A Coruña) was created for its management, making the city a national reference point for scientific dissemination.

Other new infrastructure projects undertaken in A Coruña include the Opera Palace, the Coliseum (a multipurpose building for various events, including bullfighting), the sculpture park around the Tower of Hercules, the Maritime Command tower, the controversial Leisure Centre of the port (which includes a conference center), the refurbishment of the hills of San Pedro and Bens, which were converted into extensive coastal parks, the Millennium obelisk or the remodeling of the market in the Plaza de Lugo and the Riazor stadium.

The last years of Francisco Vázquez's time in office would be marked by several controversies, such as his confrontation with the Mesa Pola Normalización Lingüística over the name of the city, defending the co-official status of the Castilian form "La Coruña" and Galician, "A Coruña", as well as certain urban planning matters aired by a local newspaper (La Opinión A Coruña). Vázquez's time as mayor ended in 2006 when the President of the Government José Luis Rodríguez Zapatero appointed him Spanish ambassador to the Holy See, and he was replaced by Javier Losada, the deputy mayor.

=== 21st century ===
In the 2007 Spanish municipal elections, the PSdeG-PSOE party with the largest number of votes lost its absolute majority. Faced with this situation, Mayor Losada formed a progressive government pact with the Galician Nationalist Bloc (BNG), naming that party's candidate, Henrique Tello, deputy mayor.

In recent decades there have been several changes in government functionality of the city. It shares various administrative functions and has reduced other military ones. Although a much of the economic activity by the service sector is still present in the city, the "headquarters effect" has been progressively losing weight. The shift resulted from the banking crisis that began in 2008, with the crisis of the Savings Banks, takeovers and various business movements. ABANCA's headquarters are now in the nearby municipality of Betanzos, after its absorption by Banco Etcheverría, the latter subsidiary of the Venezuelan bank Banesco, although A Coruña is the headquarters of the ABANCA Foundation. It continues to be the headquarters of Banco Pastor, pending its absorption by Banco Popular Español, the latter in turn absorbed by the Santander Group for the value of one euro, given the delicate situation of Banco Popular Español.

The city is home to the registered office of the communication group Corporación Voz de Galicia and the telecommunications company R. In the neighboring municipality of Arteixo is the headquarters of Inditex, the largest textile group in the world (owner of the popular brands Zara, Pull and Bear, Bershka and Massimo Dutti, among others) with important economic influence in the city. Port activity is critical (second port in Galicia in terms of fresh fish landed), cruise ship visits, and a boom in commercial port activity (oil and solid bulk goods) that have made it the leading Galician port as measured by total traffic. A Coruña’s Alvedro airport, located in Culleredo, offers regular flights to major Spanish cities and some European destinations, with significantly greater annual volume of passengers over the last decade.

The city has also become internationally known for its main football team, Real Club Deportivo de A Coruña, champion of the Spanish football league in the 1999-2000 season and several times runner-up. The team earned promotion to the first division of La Liga in 2026 for the first time in many years.

In 2008 the 800th anniversary of the refoundation of A Coruña by Alfonso IX in 1208 and the 200th anniversary of the Battle of Elviña were celebrated, an event that profoundly impacted the lives of the people of A Coruña in 1808.

On 29 June 2009, the Tower of Hercules, the millenary symbol of the city, was declared a World Heritage Site by UNESCO, following an intense campaign of institutional and citizen support.

In the last decade, municipalities such as Oleiros or Culleredo have joined in the metropolitan area, becoming a housing alternative for many people from A Coruña due to the high cost of real estate in the city. The housing market is stressed due to a number of factors, including few new developments, labor shortages, permitting hurdles, and immigration. Thousands of foreigners, most of whom are from Latin America, Morocco, China and sub-Saharan Africa have settled in A Coruña, spurring development of new neighborhoods such as Matogrande, Los Rosales, Visma and Novo Mesoiro, and the suburbanization inclusion of neighboring small cities. The recent opening of large shopping centers such as Marineda City, Espacio Coruña (or Dolce Vita, which closed in 2014), reflect the displacement of leisure activities and facilities from the city center to the periphery.

In the 2011 Municipal Elections, the conservative candidate Carlos Negreira (PP) obtained a majority, the first one for the People's Party in the city since the arrival of democracy.

The mayor of the 2015–2019 mandate was Xulio Ferreiro, from the Marea Atlántica ("Atlantic Tide") party, who was elected in 2015 on an anti-corruption mandate. His remit was to improve the town planning of the city rather than to leave it to free-market policies which some believe have left a negative legacy in many areas of the municipality. He had widespread support across the region in opposition to a project to sell off the city's port (a legacy of the preceding mayor Carlos Negreira) to a private equity firm, which wants to construct a gated community of high-rise apartment blocks for which there is no real market demand in a city with a population of around 250,000 inhabitants. The plan is to put a covenant on the land and to encourage a civic consultation on redevelopment of the site.

Samuel Luiz Muñiz, a 24-year-old nursing assistant, was beaten to death on 3 July 2021. In November 2024, three men were found guilty of his murder, one man as an accomplice, and one woman was acquitted. It was accepted by the jury that one murderer, Diego Montaña, was motivated by homophobia. The three murderers were sentenced to over 20 years in prison each, and the accomplice to 10. The murder was followed by country-wide demonstrations in Samuel Luiz's memory, and in defence of the LGBT community.

The current mayor is Inés Rey of PSdeG-PSOE. Under her leadership, the Coruña Marítima project will transform the coastal edge of the city, with the goal to develop a master plan that will guide the urban and port transformation of the city. The master plan is required to include essential objectives to strengthen port activity, boost new economic activities, improve urban and metropolitan mobility, create new public facilities, including an emblematic building that characterizes intervention, enhance green areas and sustainability.

== Geography ==
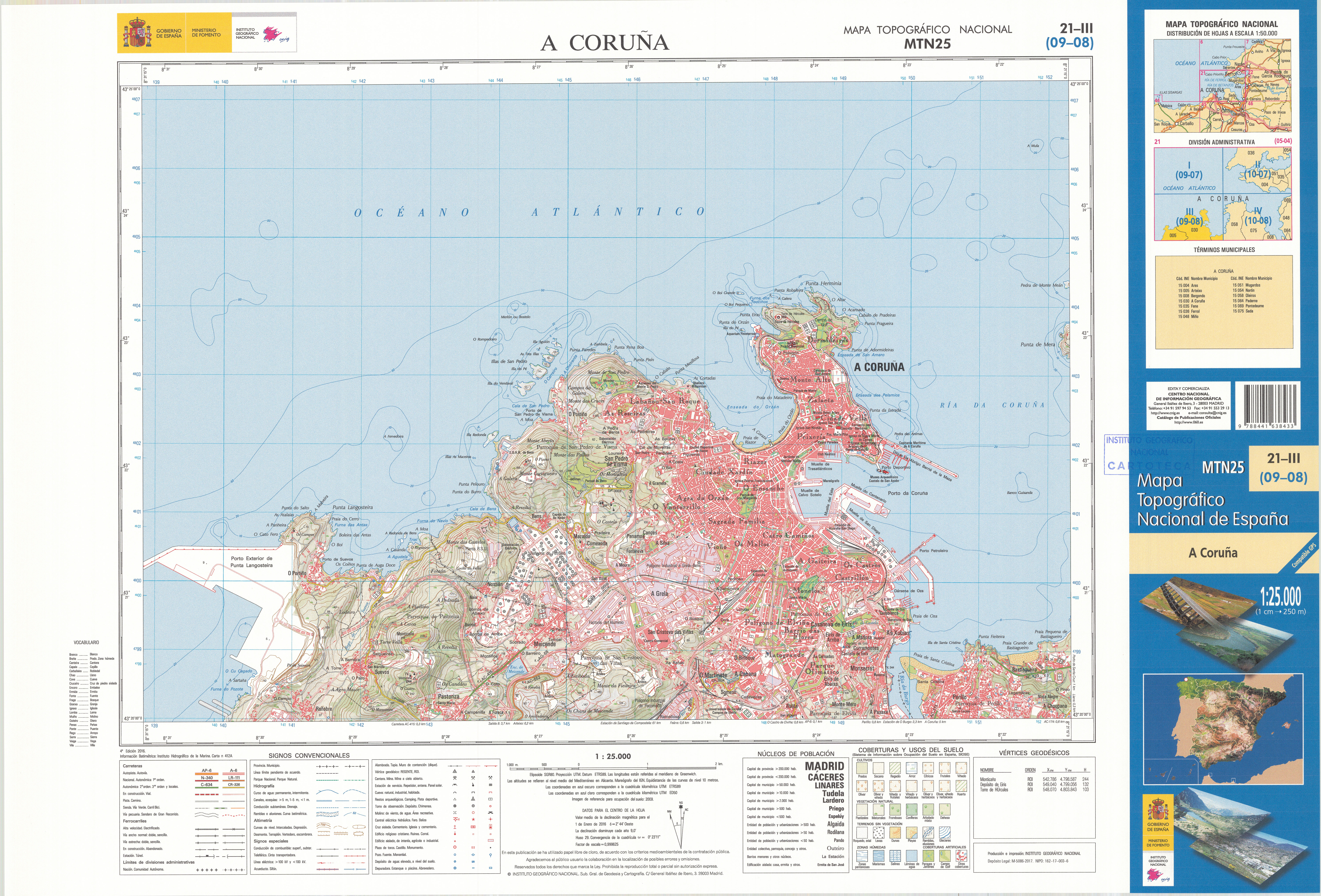
Sheet corresponding to A Coruña from the 2016 IGN's National Topographic Map of Spain

A Coruña is located on a peninsula, and its isthmus was at times formed only by a small strip of sand. Erosion and sea currents caused a progressive accumulation of sand, enlarging it to its present dimensions.

=== Climate ===
A Coruña has a temperate oceanic climate (Köppen: Cfb, Trewartha: Cfbl), closely bordering on a warm-summer Mediterranean climate, characterized by wetter winters and relatively drier summers, although significant rainfall also occurs during the warmer months. Autumn is usually mild with spring-like temperatures, but winter is often unsettled and unpredictable, with strong winds and abundant rainfall coming from Atlantic depressions. The ocean keeps temperatures mild all year round (the variation between winter and summer temperatures is only 9°C/16°F on average) and therefore frost and snow are extremely rare. In fact, the city has not received significant snowfall since January 1987. A Coruña lies in plant hardiness zone 10b.

Spring is usually warm and fairly calm, while summers are mostly sunny and humid, with occasional rainfall, usually in the form of drizzle; high temperatures are warm but rarely uncomfortably hot because of the sea's cooling influence during the day, most often being around 22 °C (72 °F) between July and September. Even the warmest month on record was relatively subdued, being August 2003, with an average high temperature of 25 °C (77 °F). Temperatures above 25 °C (77 °F) occur many days in the summer, while temperatures above 30 °C (86 °F) are infrequent.

Climate data for A Coruña 58 metres (190 feet) above sea level (1991–2020), extremes (1930-present)
Month	Jan	Feb	Mar	Apr	May	Jun	Jul	Aug	Sep	Oct	Nov	Dec	Year
Record high °C (°F)	23.1 (73.6)	27.4 (81.3)	28.2 (82.8)	31.6 (88.9)	34.0 (93.2)	34.8 (94.6)	34.5 (94.1)	39.6 (103.3)	35.4 (95.7)	33.4 (92.1)	25.4 (77.7)	25.6 (78.1)	39.6 (103.3)
Mean maximum °C (°F)	17.6 (63.7)	19.4 (66.9)	22.8 (73.0)	23.6 (74.5)	25.4 (77.7)	28.2 (82.8)	29.5 (85.1)	30.4 (86.7)	29.3 (84.7)	25.5 (77.9)	20.8 (69.4)	18.2 (64.8)	31.8 (89.2)
Mean daily maximum °C (°F)	13.6 (56.5)	14.2 (57.6)	15.7 (60.3)	16.6 (61.9)	18.7 (65.7)	20.9 (69.6)	22.4 (72.3)	23.1 (73.6)	22.2 (72.0)	19.6 (67.3)	16.1 (61.0)	14.4 (57.9)	18.1 (64.6)
Daily mean °C (°F)	11.0 (51.8)	11.2 (52.2)	12.5 (54.5)	13.4 (56.1)	15.5 (59.9)	17.7 (63.9)	19.3 (66.7)	19.9 (67.8)	18.8 (65.8)	16.5 (61.7)	13.3 (55.9)	11.8 (53.2)	15.1 (59.1)
Mean daily minimum °C (°F)	8.4 (47.1)	8.1 (46.6)	9.3 (48.7)	10.2 (50.4)	12.3 (54.1)	14.5 (58.1)	16.2 (61.2)	16.6 (61.9)	15.3 (59.5)	13.3 (55.9)	10.6 (51.1)	9.1 (48.4)	12.0 (53.6)
Mean minimum °C (°F)	3.9 (39.0)	4.0 (39.2)	4.8 (40.6)	5.9 (42.6)	8.1 (46.6)	10.9 (51.6)	12.6 (54.7)	12.9 (55.2)	11.4 (52.5)	8.9 (48.0)	6.0 (42.8)	4.4 (39.9)	2.8 (37.0)
Record low °C (°F)	−2.0 (28.4)	−3.0 (26.6)	0.6 (33.1)	2.0 (35.6)	2.2 (36.0)	4.2 (39.6)	9.9 (49.8)	9.4 (48.9)	5.2 (41.4)	4.0 (39.2)	1.0 (33.8)	−1.0 (30.2)	−3.0 (26.6)
Average precipitation mm (inches)	120.8 (4.76)	88.5 (3.48)	87.6 (3.45)	86.9 (3.42)	66.4 (2.61)	45.7 (1.80)	31.2 (1.23)	40.7 (1.60)	57 (2.2)	120.7 (4.75)	149.9 (5.90)	122.3 (4.81)	1,017.7 (40.01)
Average precipitation days (≥ 1 mm)	14.5	11.7	11.7	12.5	9.6	6.3	5.0	5.6	8.0	12.6	15.4	14.4	127.3
Average relative humidity (%)	76	73	72	74	74	75	77	77	76	76	77	76	75
Mean monthly sunshine hours	99	130	170	195	223	239	257	254	210	164	108	99	2,148
Percentage possible sunshine	34	44	46	48	49	50	55	59	56	48	37	35	47
Source 1: Agencia Estatal de Meteorologia
Source 2: AEMET"Valores climatológicos normales: A Coruña". AEMET.

== Administration ==
Domingos Rafael Merino Mexuto was the first mayor after the Spanish Constitution of 1978 for the PSG party (he is now in the BNG party), and subsequently worked at the Galician Ombudsman's (Valedor) office.

Francisco Vázquez Vázquez from the PSOE became mayor of the city in 1983; however, on becoming the Spanish ambassador to the Vatican, he was replaced by Javier Losada on 10 February 2006.

The mayor between 2015 and 2019 was Xulio Ferreiro, from the Marea Atlántica ("Atlantic Tide") party, who was largely elected in 2015 on an anti-corruption mandate. One of his main priorities was to reverse some of the very worst examples of town planning policy which has left a negative legacy in many areas of the city and its immediate suburbs.

The current mayor is Inés Rey of PSdeG-PSOE.

=== Administrative divisions ===
==== Parishes ====
A Coruña has five parishes, or parroquias: A Coruña, San Vicente de Elviña, Santa María de Oza, San Cristóbal das Viñas, and San Pedro de Visma.

==== Districts ====
- A Agra do Orzán
- A Agrela
- A Gaiteira
- A Mariña
- A Silva–San Xosé
- A Zapateira
- As Durmideiras
- As Lagoas
- As Roseiras (Rosales)
- Barrio das Flores
- Bens
- Casabranca–As Xubias
- Catro Camiños
- Cidade Vella (Old town)
- Cidade Xardín
- Eirís
- Elviña
- Ensanche
- Falperra–Santa Lucía
- Feáns
- Juan Flórez–San Paulo
- Labañou–San Roque
- Matogrande
- Mesoiro
- Monelos
- Monte Alto
- Nostián
- Novo Mesoiro
- O Birloque
- O Castrillón
- O Martinete
- O Peruleiro
- O Portiño
- O Ventorrillo
- Os Cantóns
- Os Castros
- Os Mallos
- Palavea
- Paseo das Pontes
- Pescaría (Pescadería)
- Riazor
- Sagrada Familia-Campo de Vionho
- San Cristovo das Viñas
- San Pedro de Visma
- San Vicenzo de Elviña
- Santa Margarida
- Santa Xema
- Someso
- Torre-As Atochas
- Zalaeta-Orzán

== Demographics ==
Historical population
Year	Pop.	±%
1842	25,060	—
1857	33,597	+34.1%
1877	43,026	+28.1%
1887	47,699	+10.9%
1900	53,930	+13.1%
1910	58,724	+8.9%
1920	63,603	+8.3%
1930	71,511	+12.4%
1940	98,834	+38.2%
1950	127,618	+29.1%
1960	173,661	+36.1%
1970	189,467	+9.1%
1981	231,721	+22.3%
1991	246,953	+6.6%
2001	236,379	−4.3%
2011	245,053	+3.7%
2021	245,541	+0.2%
Including Oza, which became part of A Coruña after the 1910 census. Source: INE

As of 2025, the population is 251,277, of which 46.4% are males, and 53.6% are females. Minors make up 13.7% of the population, and seniors make up 25.6%.

The A Coruña metropolitan area has 431,332 inhabitants as of 2016.

The population of the City of A Coruña in 1900 reached 43,971, while the population of the rest of the province including the City and Naval Station of nearby Ferrol as well as Santiago de Compostela was 653,556. A Coruña's miraculous growth happened during the aftermath of the Spanish Civil War at a similar rate to other major Galician cities, but it was after the death of Francisco Franco when the city of A Coruña (and Vigo) left all the other Galician cities behind.

The meteoric increase in the population of the City of A Coruña during the years which followed the Spanish Civil War in the mid-20th century was accompanied by the decline in the villages and hamlets of the province as it industrialized.

=== Languages ===
Three quarters of the population speaks Galician to a greater or lesser extent, something that happens in very few communities with a minority language. The level of knowledge of the native language of Galicia is very high: more than 83% of the population states they know how to speak Galician and more than 93% say they understand it. In certain areas, such as in press and on the internet, the use of Galician has increased, and the number of homes where both Galician and Spanish are used has increased.

=== Immigration ===
Foreign population by country of birth (2025)
Country of birth	Population
Venezuela	9,265
Colombia	4,540
Peru	3,870
Cuba	3,847
Argentina	3,033
Brazil	2,109
Dominican Republic	1,787
Uruguay	1,709
Switzerland	1,441
United Kingdom	1,182
Senegal	1,010
Morocco	878
France	840
Germany	631
China	547

As of 2025, immigrants make up 17.8% of the population. The 5 largest foreign countries of birth are Venezuela, Colombia, Peru, Cuba, and Argentina.

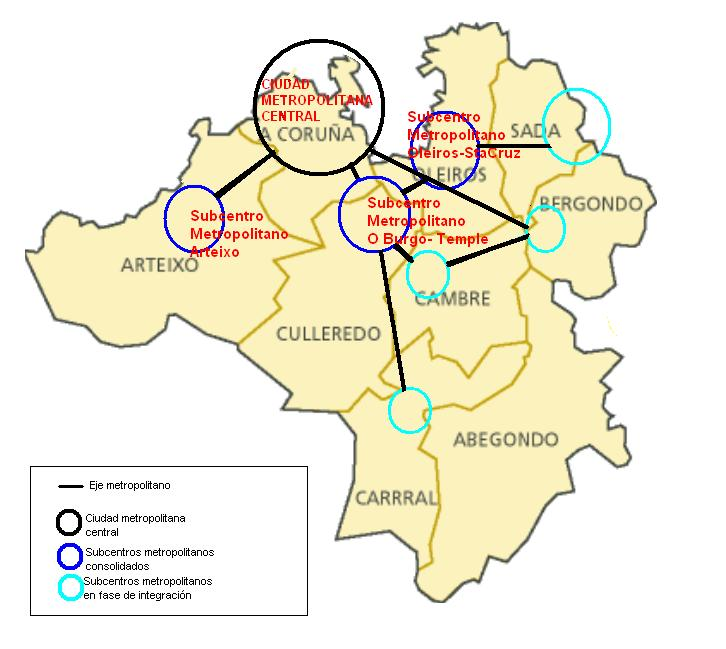
Metropolitan area map

== Sights ==
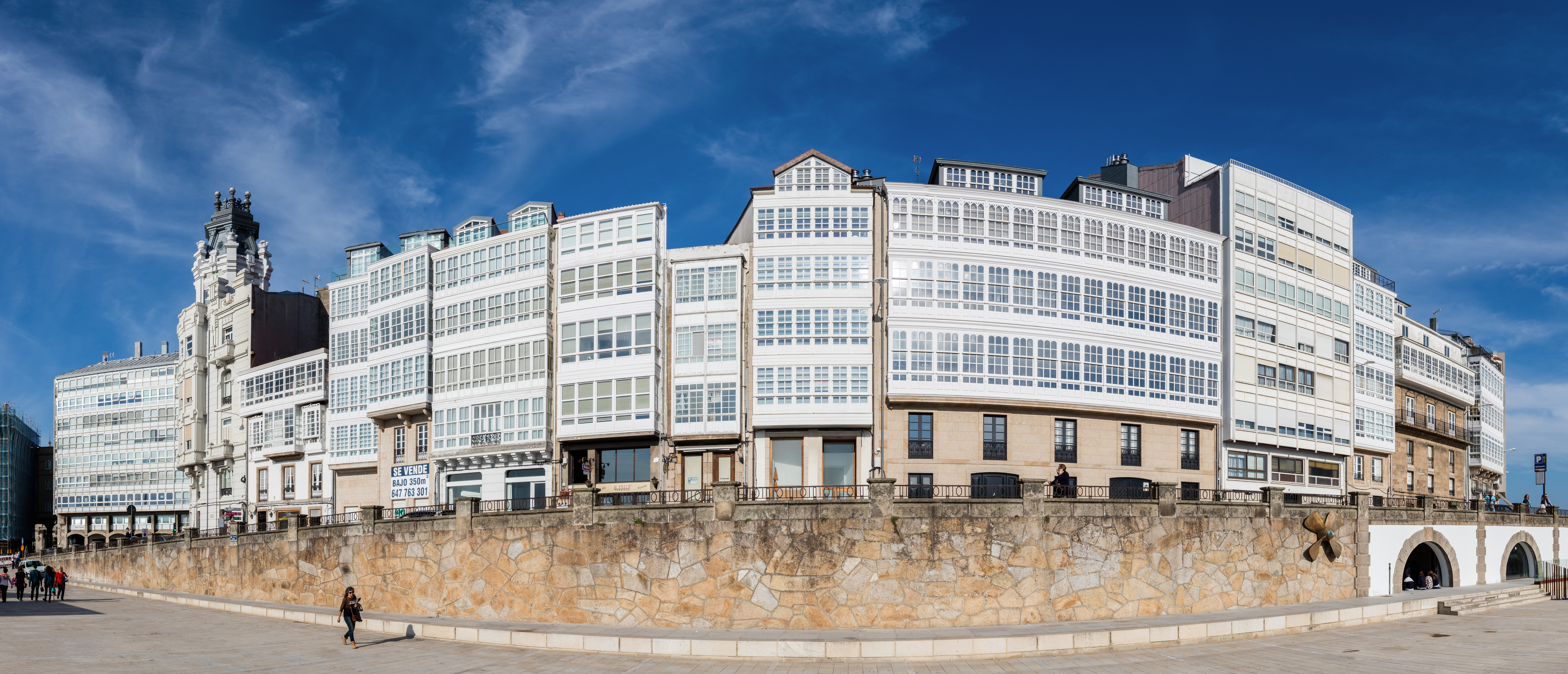
Galerías in A Coruña

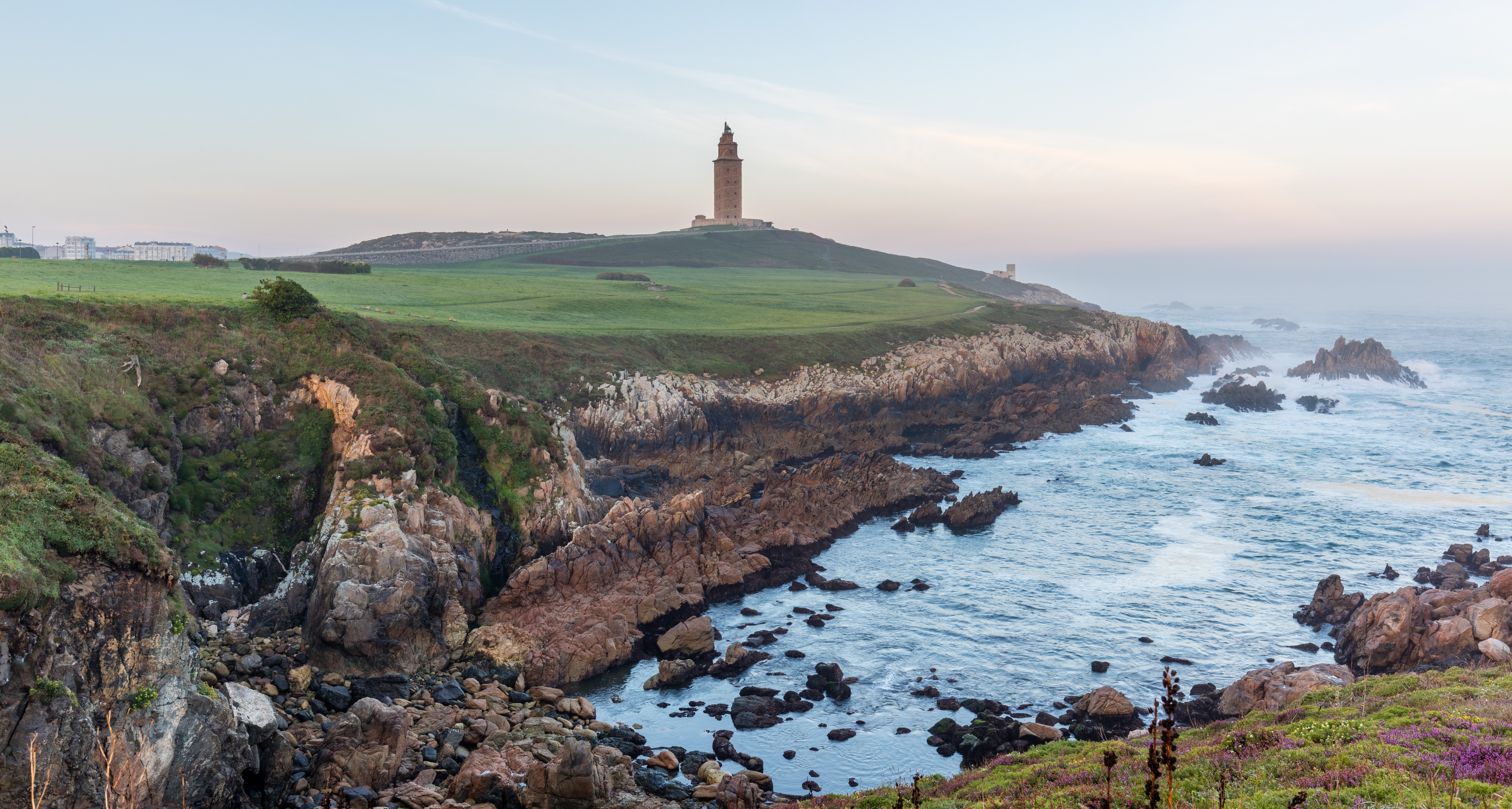
The Tower of Hercules, reconstruction and modernization of the famous Roman lighthouse

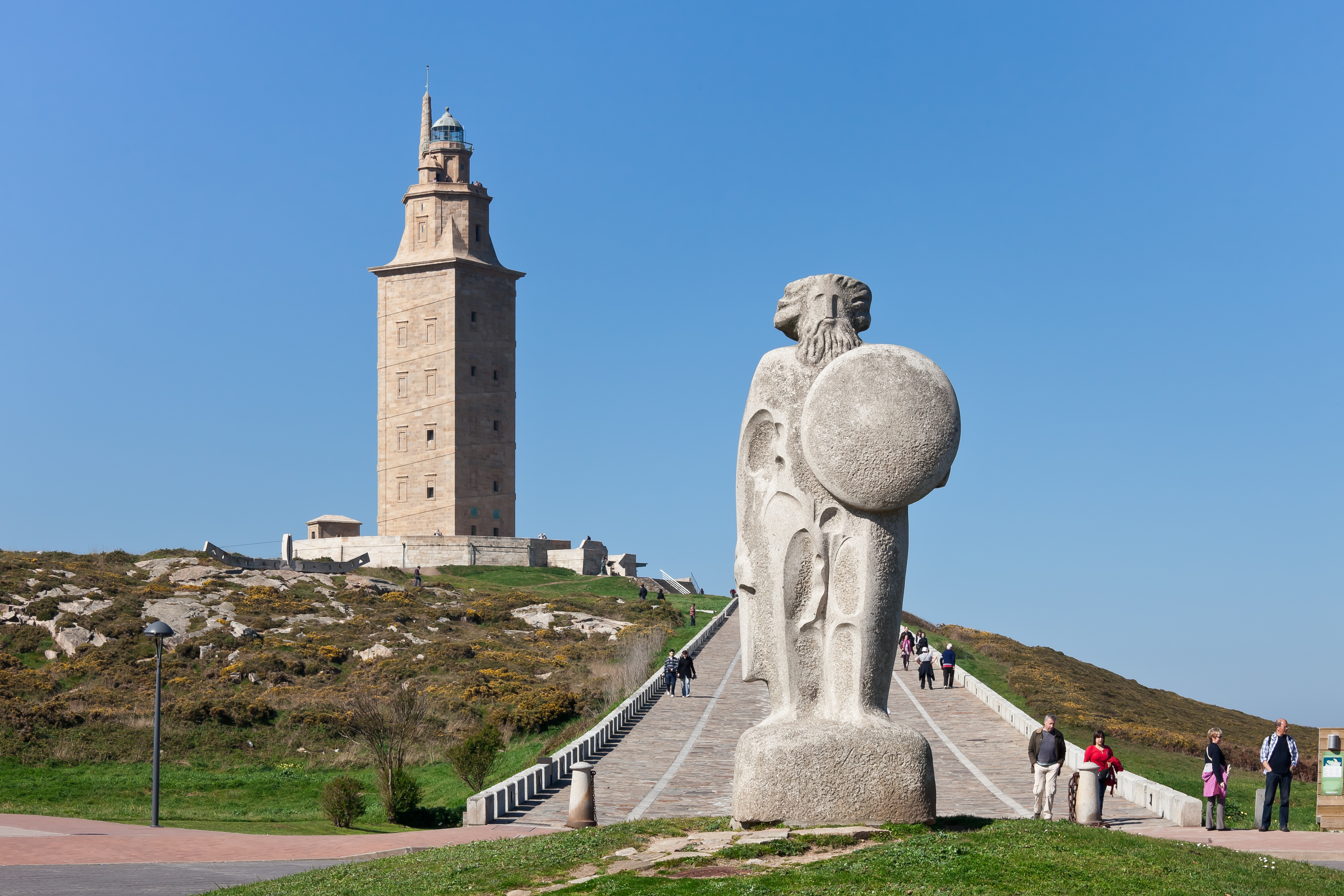
Celtic King Breogan in A Coruña

The city is the site of the Roman Tower of Hercules, a lighthouse which has been in continuous operation since possibly the 2nd century AD. It has been declared by UNESCO as a World Heritage Site. It is surrounded by a large public park with a golf course and the so-called Moor's Graveyard (Cemiterio do Mouro in Galician, Cementerio del Moro in Spanish) a building where in fact there were never burials, Muslim or not, which now houses the Casa das Palabras (Galician for House of Words) museum. The lighthouse features as the main emblem of the city's flag and coat of arms.

The city is also well known for its characteristic glazed window balconies, called galerías. Originally, this type of structure came about as a naval architecture solution for the challenging weather, particularly designed for rainy days. This fashion started in nearby Ferrol in the 18th century when some of the technicians working for the Royal Dockyards had the idea of using the shape of the back of a warship in a modern building. Soon afterward, most seaports in northern Spain, were adding these glazed window balconies to their city-port houses.

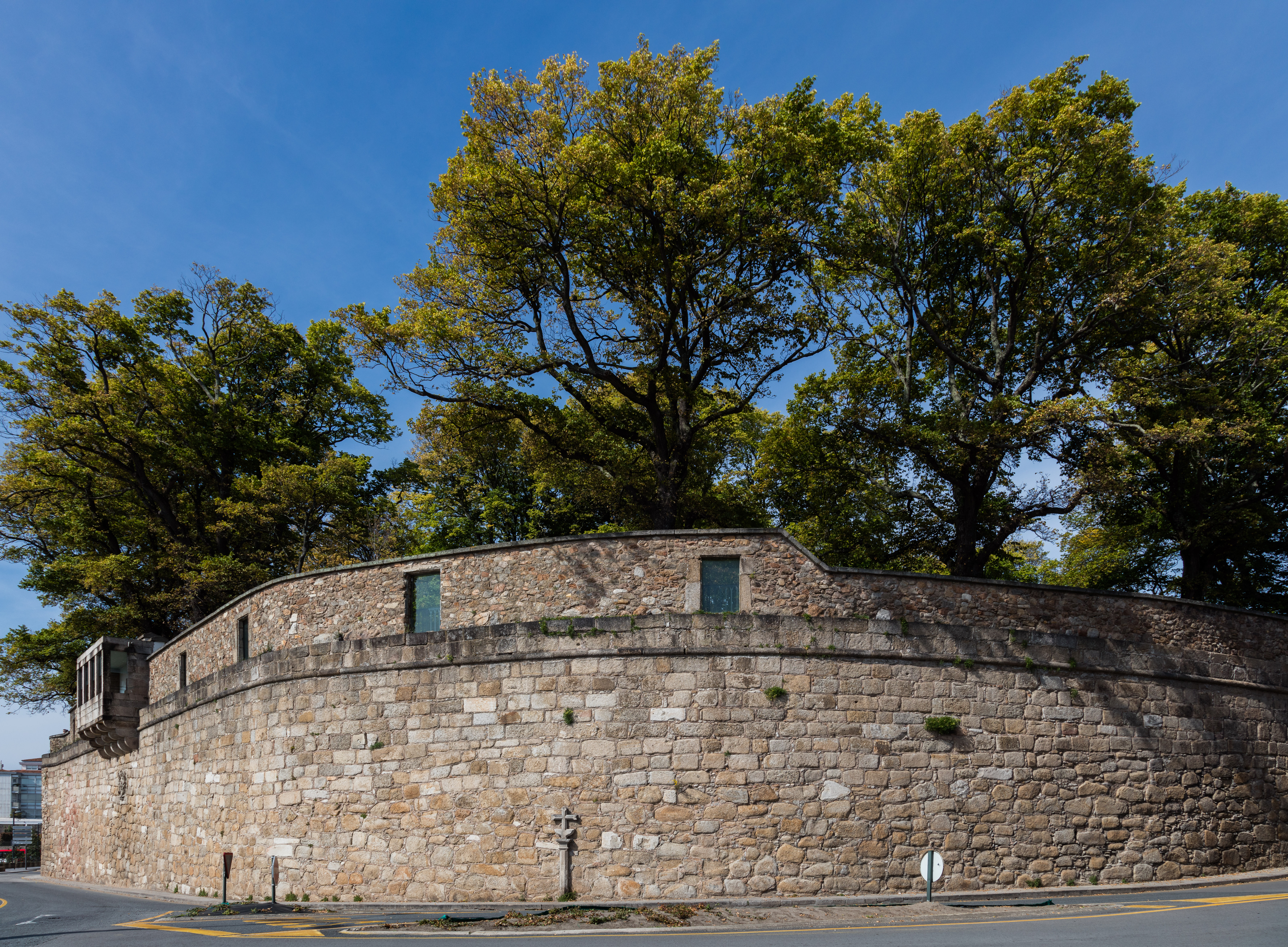
Old city wall

The Old Town (Ciudad Vieja in Spanish, Cidade Vella in Galician) is the name given to the oldest part of A Coruña. During the ninth and tenth centuries, the inhabitants of what was then called Faro Island (peninsula where the Tower of Hercules stands) were leaving the area due to constant attacks by the Viking fleet and settled in the area of Betanzos. In 1208 King Alfonso IX refounded the city at the present site of the Old Town and put it under his personal control, free from allegiance to the clergy or feudal lords. In the fourteenth century, the scarcely-surviving city walls of the Old Town were built, as well as three harbors: the Parrot and San Miguel. It also preserves the stronghold known as the Old Fortress, now converted into the Garden of San Carlos, in which Sir John Moore is buried. The Old City of A Coruña kept streets and squares that revive the city's history and noble mansions and residences such as Rosalia de Castro's house, located on Prince Street. Notable buildings are the Royal Galician Academy, the institution dedicated to the study of Galician culture and especially the Galician language, the Romanesque churches of Santiago and Saint Mary, As Bárbaras Monastery (Romanesque and Baroque) and the headquarters of the Operational Logistics Force of the Spanish Army. In July, a Medieval Fair takes place in the streets of the Old City.

The city has several museums, such as the Castle of San Antón Archaeological Museum, Fine Arts Museum and the network of scientific museums (Casa das Ciencias, which also includes a planetarium, DOMUS, made by Arata Isozaki and Aquarium Finisterrae). In 2012, the National Museum of Science and Technology (MUNCYT) opened a branch in the city. A Coruña's social scene is most popular on Summer nights. Most bars and clubs are on Rua do Orzán, which runs directly parallel to Paseo Maritimo on the beach side. Another popular destination, primarily for a more youthful crowd, is Os Xardins (The Gardens), a park near the beginning of Rúa Real and the Os Cantons Village Shopping Centre.

=== Squares, parks and beaches ===
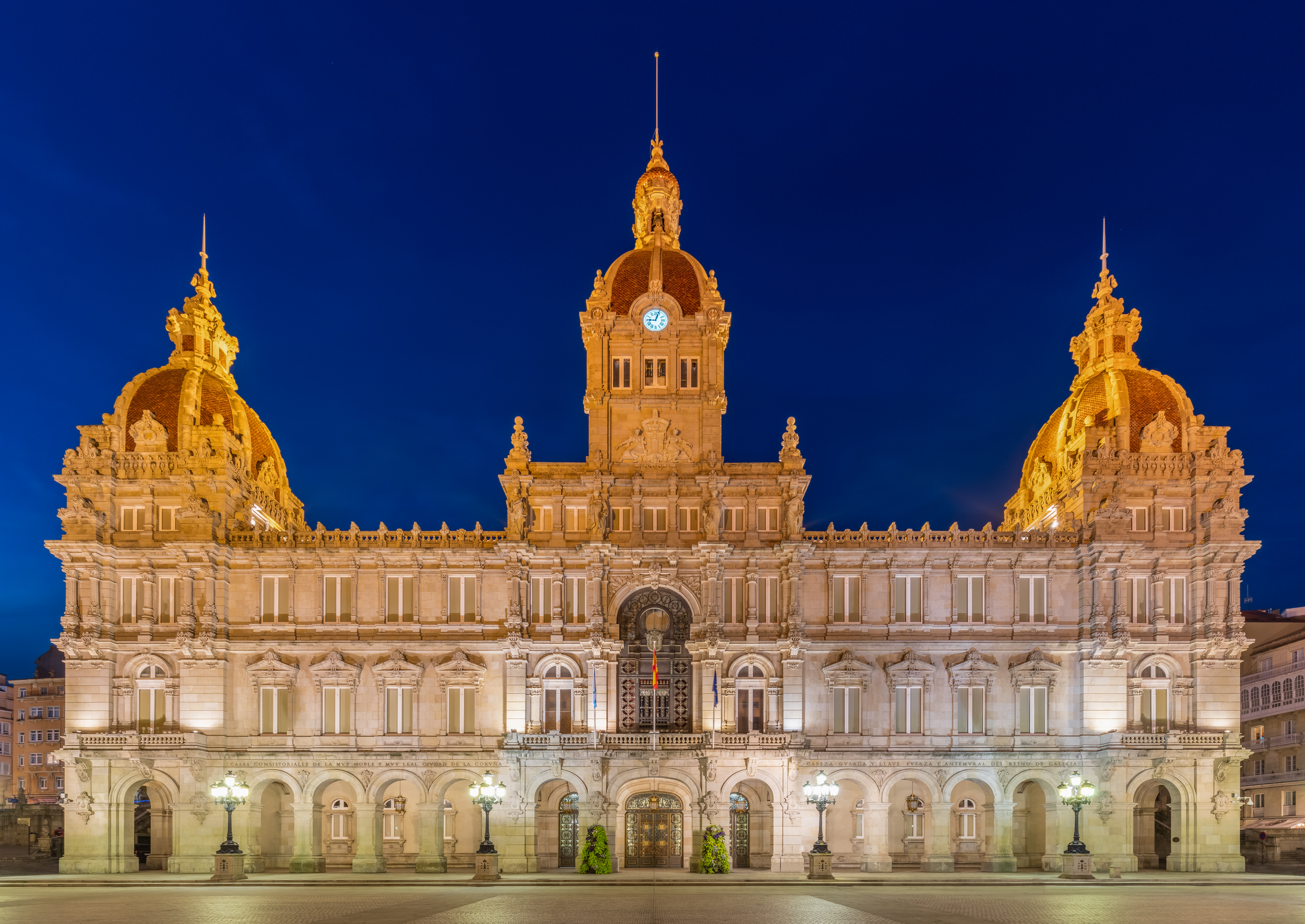
City Hall

- María Pita Square, the most important square in the city. Notable landmarks are the City Hall and the statue of the local heroine Maria Pita. Nearby you can also find Church of Saint George, where first same-sex marriage in Spain took place between Elisa and Marcela in 1901, which is the basis for the movie of the same name.
- Mount of San Pedro Park, a former military area, with views over the city and the ria. Visitors can arrive by road or using an elevator from the promenade. It has a café, play areas, gardens and three restored artillery pieces.
- The promenade (Paseo Marítimo) is nine kilometres (5.6 miles) long, one of the largest in Europe. It runs around the city's headland, passing sights such as its Aquarium, the Estadio Riazor and the Tower of Hercules. There used to be a functioning touristic tramway, opened between 1997 and 2002, which ceased operations after a derailment in 2011.
- In the summertime, the Orzán and Riazor beaches are immensely popular destinations, located directly opposite of the port in the central part of the city. During María Pita festivity, which takes place all through August, Riazor is the venue of Noroeste Pop Rock Festival, a free music festival with groups from Spain and abroad (Amaral, David Bisbal, Joe Cocker or Status Quo have played on it in last editions). Other beaches in the city smaller than Orzan and Riazor are As Lapas down Hercules Tower, O Matadoiro next to Orzan, San Amaro and Oza.

== Culture ==
The city's principal festival is the María Pita Festival, which lasts from the end of July to mid-September. The festival includes Noroeste (free concerts at various plazas throughout the city), the medieval fair Feira das Marabillas in the Old Town, the International Folklore Festival, a book fair, Festival Viñetas desde o Atlántico, a comic fair, Virxe do Rosario's day and, starting in 2011, a recreation of the famous German Oktoberfest. Another very popular festival with pagan roots is St. John's Day, which is celebrated on the summer solstice 23 June with bonfires under the night sky on beaches and neighbourhoods all over the city. More than 150,000 people go out from afternoon to early morning in order to frighten the evil spirits away by jumping over the bonfires.

The city is home to two main theatres, Teatro Colón and Teatro Rosalía, with regular performances, music concerts and other representations. A multipurpose centre, the Coliseum, hosts a variety of concerts and cultural and sporting events. International artists such as David Copperfield, Maná, Mark Knopfler, Shakira, Gloria Estefan, Iron Maiden, Deep Purple and Judas Priest and others have performed there. In summer it can be converted to serve as a bullring, and in winter as an ice rink. The bullring of A Coruña was a bullfighting venue inaugurated on 2 July 1885. The last bullfight held there was on 7 October 1967. After twenty-five years without a bullfighting venue, a multipurpose facility was inaugurated in 1991 at the Coliseum, which houses, among other spaces, the city's first covered bullring.

A Coruña has several museums, such as the Castle of San Antón Archaeological Museum, its Fine Arts Museum, the Military Museum and the network of scientific museums (Casa das Ciencias, which includes a planetarium, DOMUS, made by Arata Isozaki and Aquarium Finisterrae). In 2012, the [National Museum of Science and Technology (MUNCYT) opened a branch in the city.

=== Literature and arts ===
A Coruña has a long-standing literary and artistic tradition, particularly noted for its contribution to Galician and Spanish intellectual life.

The city’s intellectual history is defined by several prominent figures:

- Emilia Pardo Bazán (1851–1921): A prominent novelist and essayist who introduced Naturalism to Spain. She was a pioneer in the struggle for women's rights and access to education.
- María Casares (1922–1996): An actress of stage and screen. Born in A Coruña, she achieved fame in France after her family went into exile during the Spanish Civil War.
- Luísa Villalta (1952–2004): A poet, writer, and musician whose work is deeply connected to the city's urban identity. She was the dedicatee of the Galician Literature Day in 2024.
- Estíbaliz Espinosa (born 1974): A contemporary poet and singer whose work integrates the humanities with astronomy and biology.

== Economy ==
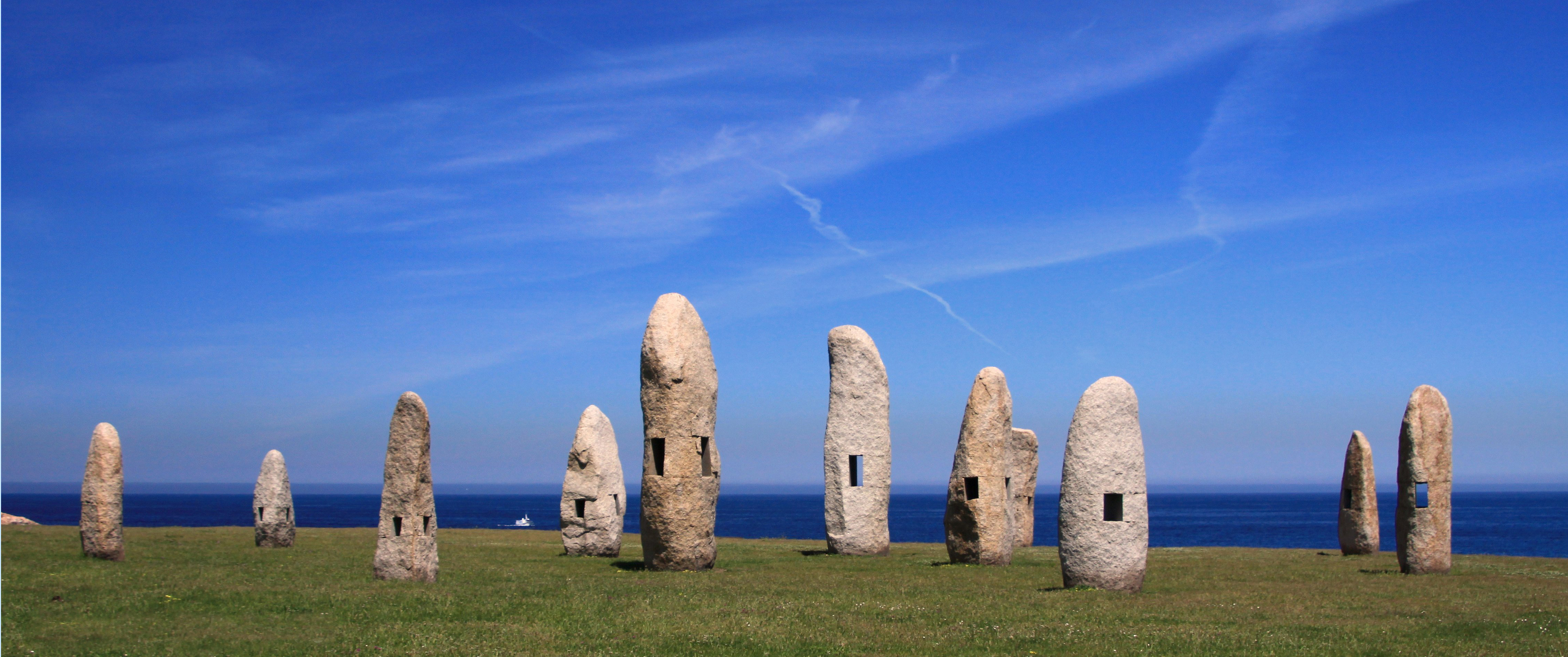
Menhirs in A Coruña

A Coruña is currently the richest region of Galicia and is its economic engine. There have been various changes in the city's structure over the last few decades—it now shares some administrative functions with the nearby city of Ferrol. Companies have grown, especially in sectors such as finance, communication, planning, sales, manufacturing and technical services, making A Coruña the wealthiest metropolitan area of Galicia. The port itself unloads large amounts of fresh fish, and with the increase in other port activities like crude oil and solid bulk, which make up 75% of Galician port traffic.

In 1975, the clothing company Zara, founded by Amancio Ortega Gaona, opened its first store worldwide in this city and has since become a national and international clothing chain.

Inditex, the main textile manufacturer of the world, has its headquarters in the nearby town of Arteixo. A Coruña concentrates 30% of the GDP of Galicia and in the period between 1999 and 2001 it grew 35%, surpassing Vigo which was traditionally economically stronger. Other important companies of the city are Banco Pastor (owned by Banco Popular Español), Banco Etcheverría (oldest in Spain), Hijos de Rivera Brewery, Abanca, R Cable Operator, the Repsol refinery, Gas Natural combined cycle power plant, General Dynamics factory, Alcoa aluminium plant and La Voz de Galicia, a Spanish-language conservative daily newspaper, the one with the largest circulation in Galicia. A Coruña is also an important retail center. El Corte Inglés, the main department store chain in Spain, has two centers in the city, one of them in the renovated shopping mall Marineda City, opened in April 2011, one of the biggest shopping centers in the EU, which also includes, among others, IKEA, Mercadona and Decathlon stores, cinemas, an ice rink, a bowling alley and a kart circuit. Other hypermarket chains present in the city are Gadis, Carrefour (two centers), Hipercor and Auchan (known in Spain as Alcampo).

Over the last few years, emphasis has been placed upon better access and infrastructure, especially cultural, sporting, leisure and scientific areas. Following a significant oil spill when the Aegean Sea wrecked and exploded, considerable resources have been used in the recovery of the shoreline and strengthening the tourist sector. All this has reaffirmed the city's existing character as a centre for administration, sales, port activities, culture and tourism. The city also has a regional airport, used by 1.025.688 passengers in 2015 with regular flights to Madrid, Barcelona and London.

=== Tourism ===
Tourism in A Coruña has increased in recent years to the point of receiving 184 cruise ship calls (and roughly 465,199 passengers) in 2025.

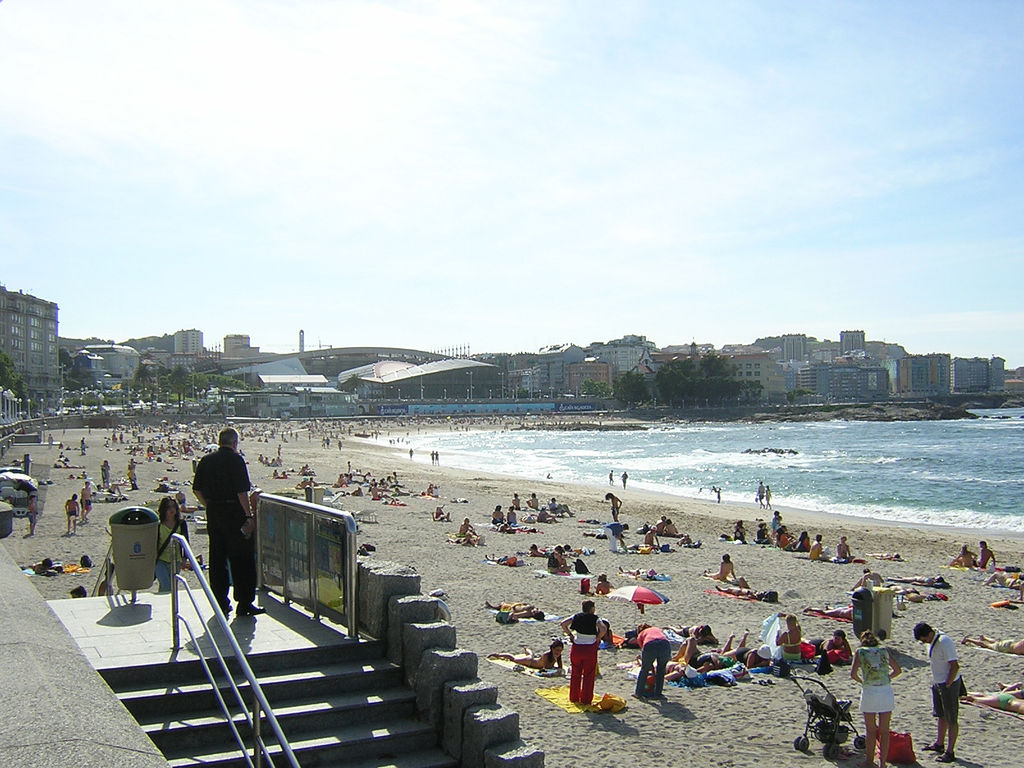
Riazor beach with Estadio Riazor in the background

The two main beaches of A Coruña (Orzán and Riazor) are located in the heart of the city and are bordered by the promenade above. This location makes them a great attraction for tourists, being also a meeting point for surfers much of the year. Moreover, the city's other beaches of As Lapas, San Amaro, Oza and Matadoiro, along with Riazor and Orzán, were recognized with blue flag certification in 2011.

An important holiday is on the night of San Xoán-Seaone (St John), celebrated on 23 June with a massive fireworks celebration, parade, bonfires and the ancient fires on all city beaches well into dawn.

In 2006 and for the first time ever, the number of tourists has doubled the population of the city, virtually to 500,000 the number of people who chose the city as a tourist destination.

The city has an extensive network of hotels, with an offer of over 3,000 hotel vacancies. There is 1 five-star hotel and 11 four-star hotels, as well as many other hotels and hostels. The city is also focusing on business tourism, offering the Congress and Exhibition Centre PALEXCO, with room for more than 2,500 people; a new trade fair centre, EXPOCORUÑA, venue of concerts, exhibitions and festivals like Sónar.

The city is also located on the English Way, a path of the Camino de Santiago.

== Education ==
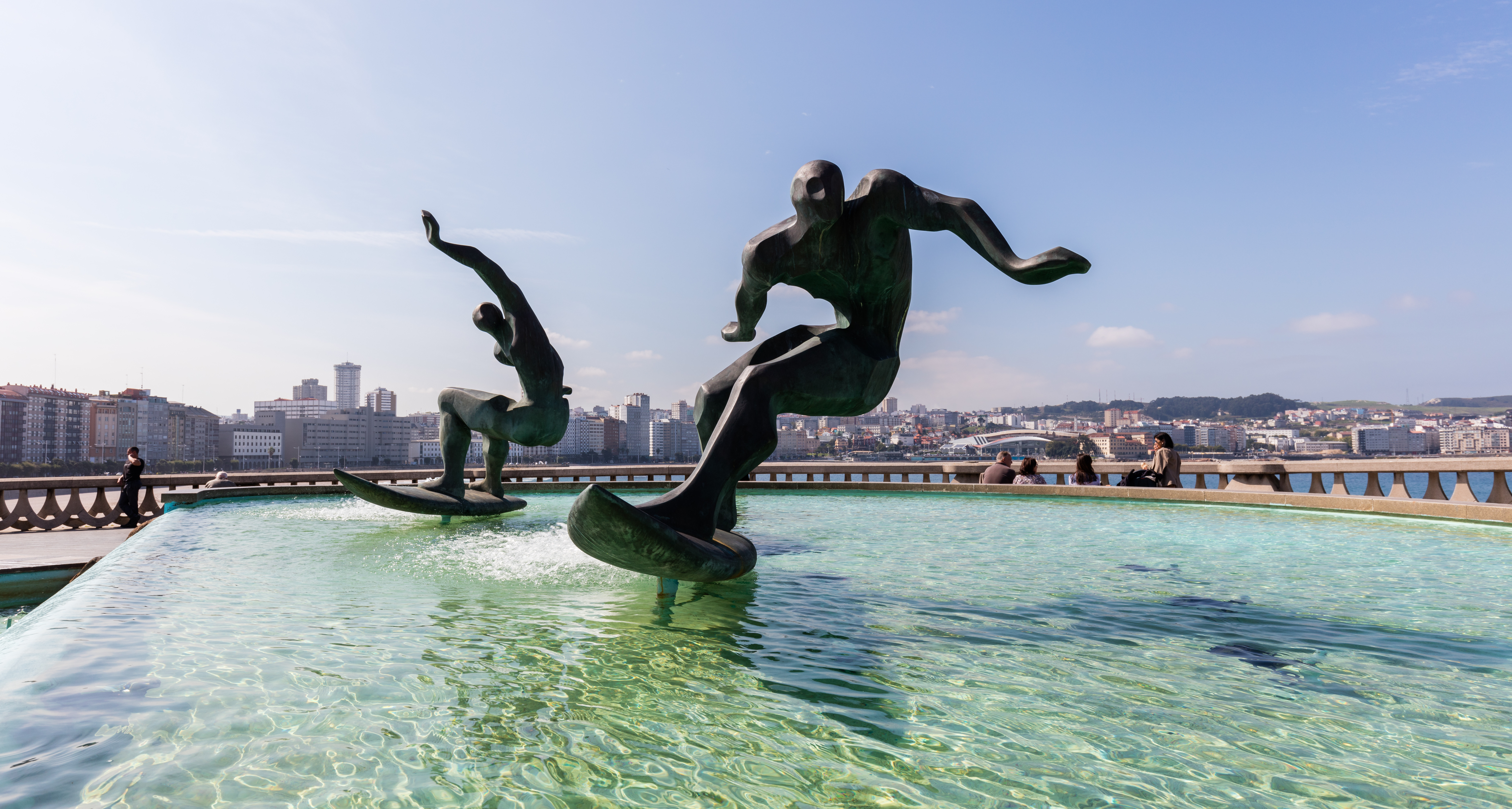
Fountain in honor of the surfers in the beaches of the city

There are 38 pre-school centres, 47 primary schools, 29 vocational schools and 33 secondary schools in the city.

Higher education is represented by the University of A Coruña, a public university established in 1989, the UNED branch, and CESUGA, a private university centre in alliance with University College Dublin, which offers Bachelor of Commerce and Bachelor of Architecture Irish degrees. Escuela de Negocios NCG offers MBA and other master's degrees in business.

There are seven municipal libraries, one library that belongs to the provincial government and one public library, administered by the Xunta. The Archive of the Kingdom of Galicia (Arquivo do Reino de Galicia in Galician) is located in the Old Town.

There is an Escola Oficial de Idiomas (Spanish language school) centre, which offers classes in English, French, Galician, Italian, German, Portuguese, Arabic, Russian, Chinese, Japanese and Spanish as a foreign language.

Music studies are well represented by the Escola Municipal de Música, a Music school. A Coruña is also the base for the Orquesta Sinfónica de Galicia.

== Science and research ==
The city is a significant regional hub for scientific research and dissemination.

A Coruña has a historical connection to the Age of Enlightenment and modern scientific innovation:

- Isabel Zendal: Born in the province and associated with the city's hospital, she was the nurse who led the Balmis Expedition (1803), which departed from A Coruña to transport the smallpox vaccine to the Americas and Asia.
- Joseph Cornide (Xosé Cornide): An 18th-century Enlightenment polymath who contributed extensively to the study of geography, natural history, and archaeology.

The city is known for its network of scientific museums, known as Museos Científicos Coruñeses, which include:

- Casa de las Ciencias: A science museum and planetarium.
- Domus: The first interactive museum dedicated to human biology.
- Aquarium Finisterrae: A center for marine biology and oceanography located on the Atlantic coast.

Research is largely driven by the University of A Coruña, which hosts specialized centers such as:

- CITIC (Research Centre for Information and Communications Technology): A center focused on Artificial Intelligence and data science.
- CICA (Interdisciplinary Centre for Chemistry and Biology): A facility dedicated to biotechnology and environmental science.

== Transport ==
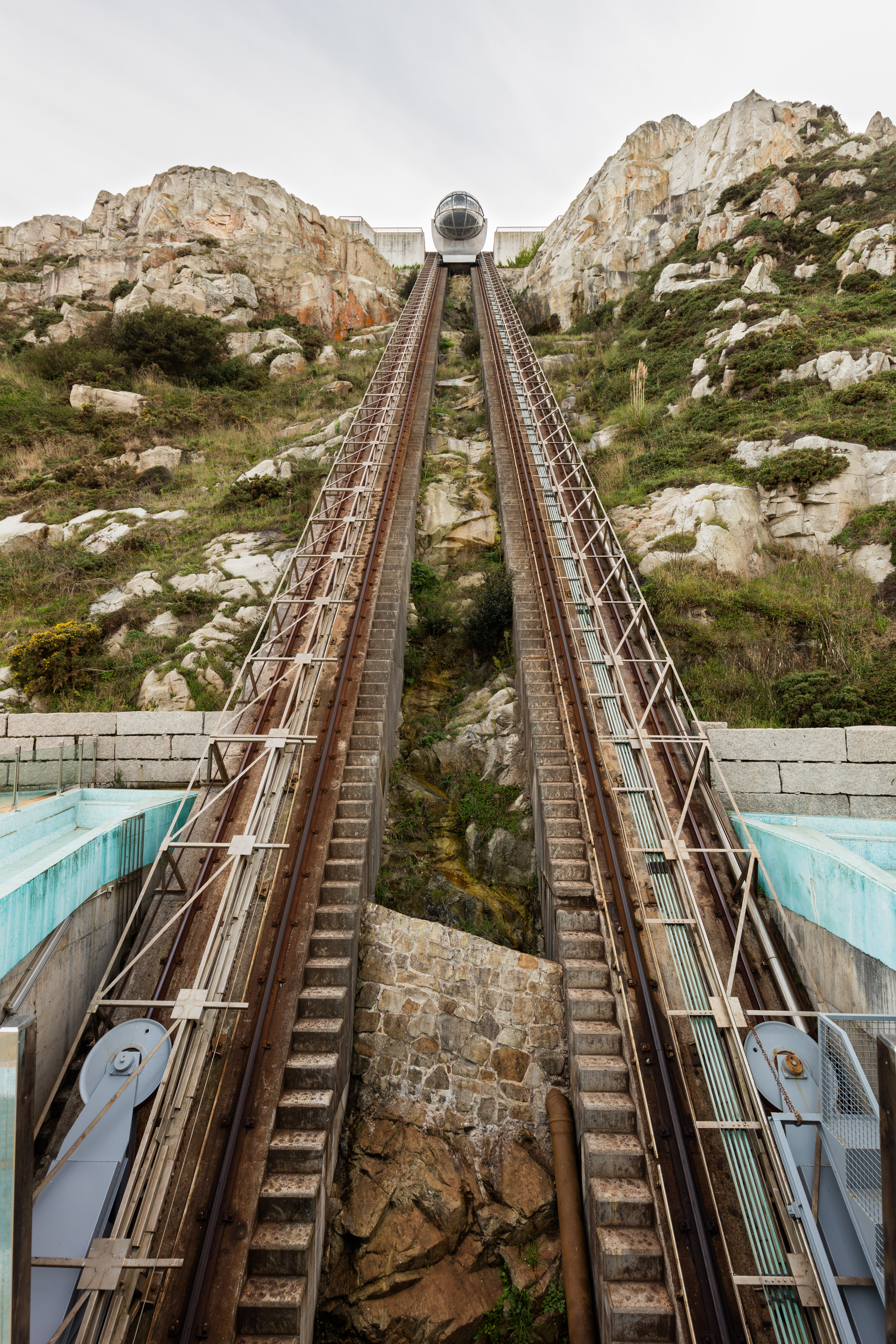
Panoramic elevator to San Pedro Hill

A Coruña is the destination of one of the radial roads originating in Madrid, (N-VI). Currently there is a highway (Autovía A-6) that runs parallel to the old radial road. Another major road running through the city is the toll motorway AP-9, which links Ferrol with the Portuguese border crossing the main cities of Galicia. AG-55 motorway links the city with the Costa da Morte, although currently only going as far as Carballo. The conventional road N-550 (A Coruña-Tui) was the main link to the airport while the new highway AC-14 was under construction.

=== Air transport ===
A Coruña Airport, formerly known as Alvedro Airport, is located in the municipality of Culleredo, approximately 7 kilometres (4.3 miles) from the city centre. It serves mainly Spanish destinations, although there is regular service to London and Lisbon and, in the summer season, to Amsterdam and Paris. In 2010, 1,101,208 passengers used the airport. In 2022, 963,952 passengers used the airport.

=== Rail transport ===
Railway services depart from San Cristovo Station. The city is connected with Madrid and Vigo by high-speed rail since 2021 via the Madrid–Galicia high-speed rail line. Regional lines connect the city with Vigo through Santiago de Compostela and Pontevedra, Lugo and Monforte de Lemos. Intercity Avé, Avlo and Avant trains depart to Madrid Chamartín ten times daily. A freight train station serves the port and is not open to the public.

=== Intercity buses ===
Regional and intercity buses depart from the Bus station at Caballeros Street, 200 meters away and connected to the train station by an open-air pedestrian sky walk and city streets. A Coruña is well connected by autobus with its metropolitan area and other Galician cities and towns. Intercity bus services provided by ALSA, Arriva Galicia, Monbus and FlixBus connect the city with Madrid, Barcelona, Andalusia and the Basque Country among others and with European cities such as Geneva, Paris or Munich.

=== Local public transport ===
Local transportation in A Coruña is provided by es:Compañía de Tranvías de La Coruña, which has held its major unified municipal bus service contract for nearly 38 years, from 6 February 1987, until it officially expired on 31 December 2024. The company itself has operated public transport in the city for over 120 years. Its network includes 24 bus lines served by 95 vehicles. Despite its name containing the Spanish word for tramway, it no longer operates any trams. The tramway had been inaugurated in 1903 as a horse drawn tram which was electrified starting in 1911 with the last horse drawn trams withdrawn in 1913. The tram was partially replaced by trolleybuses before completely shutting down in 1962. The tram was subsequently revived in 1995 as a heritage tramway before again ceasing operations in 2011. The tram rails are being removed as part of regular street maintenance. The trolleybus which had replaced the tram after World War II was itself withdrawn in 1979.

== Sport ==
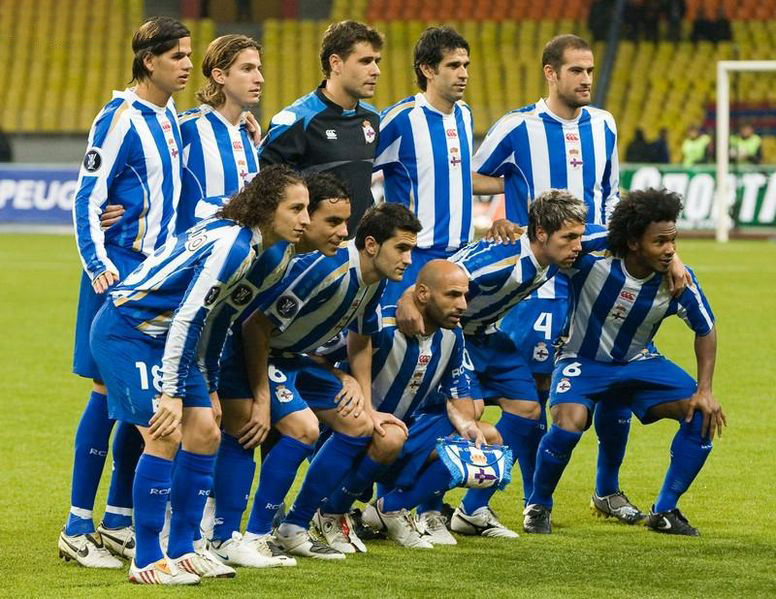
Deportivo team in the 2008–09 UEFA Cup

A Coruña has an extensive network of sports infrastructures. The most important one is the Riazor Sport Complex, which includes Estadio Riazor (home of Deportivo de A Coruña), the Palace of Sports (home of HC Liceo A Coruña), two indoor tracks, a pelota court and an indoor swimming-pool. La Torre Sport Complex hosts many football fields, a golf court and another pelota court. There are also five municipal football fields, 11 sports centres and several marinas (Real Club Náutico, Marina Coruña, etc.). In 2007 the Termaria Casa da Auga complex was opened, which has a gymnasium, a thalassotherapy centre and an indoor Olympic-sized swimming pool.

Founded in 1906, Deportivo competes in the top tier Primera División as of the 2026–27 season. Since the Spanish football league system was established in 1928, it has spent 47 seasons in the Primera División (first division) and 43 seasons in the Segunda División (second division). They have won the league title once, in the 1999–2000 season, and finished as runners-up on five occasions. The club also won two Spanish Cups (1995 and 2002) and three Spanish Super Cups, along with five Segunda División titles, the last one being in the 2011–12 season. Between 2000–01 and 2004–05, Deportivo played in the UEFA Champions League for five consecutive seasons, and reached the semi-finals in 2004. The women's section of the club plays in Spain's top division, Liga F, as of the 2026–27 season.

The city has a roller hockey team, HC Liceo, one of the most successful in Spain, and the team plays in the main League OK Liga. They became Europe's Champions in 2011.

The city's basketball team, Básquet Coruña, plays in Liga ACB, the Spanish top division. Handball teams OAR Ciudad 1952 and Balonman Xiria currently plays in the Spanish third division. The American football team Towers Football currently play in LGFA, the Galician regional gridiron football league.

Two Gaelic football teams were founded in 2010 and 2011, A Coruña Fillos de Breogán (with men and women's teams) and Ártabros de Oleiros (also originating in A Coruña). They participate in the Iberian Championship and in the Galician League.

Casas Novas riding club, in the outskirts of the city, hosts many national and international championships.

In tenpin bowling, A Coruña is home to the annual Teresa Herrera de Bowling tournament, played in the Pleno Bowling Centre, Marineda City. It attracts players from all of Spain.

== Notable people ==
- Maria Pita, María Mayor Fernández de Cámara y Pita (born in Cambre, 1565–1643), a heroine of the defence of A Coruña in 1589 against the English Armada
- Ramón Dionisio José de la Sagra y Peris (1798–1871), botany teacher, philosopher and social economist
- Evaristo Martelo Paumán (1850–1928), poet and Rexurdimento activist
- Emilia Pardo Bazán (1851–1921), novelist, journalist, essayist and critic
- Eduardo Dato (1856–1921), lawyer and politician
- Ramón Menéndez Pidal (1869–1968), writer
- Eugenia Osterberger (1852–1932), pianist and composer
- Santiago Iglesias Pantín (1872-1939), labor organizer and politician
- José Millán Astray (1879-1954), Military figure and founder of the Spanish Foreign Legion
- Pablo Picasso, (1881–1973), artist, lived here for four years in the 1890s
- Santiago Casares Quiroga (1884–1950), lawyer and politician
- Wenceslao Fernández Flórez (1885–1964), narrator and journalist
- Celia Brañas (1880–1948) scientist and teacher fought for the education and inclusion of women into the scientific community in Spain
- Salvador de Madariaga y Rojo (1896–1978), writer and poet
- Enrique Líster (1907–1994), communist politician and military general
- Irene González Basanta (1909–1928), Spain's first professional woman footballer
- Fernando Casado Arambillet (1917–1994), better known as Fernando Rey, actor
- Amando de Ossorio (1918–2001), film director
- Carmela Arias y Díaz de Rábago (1920–2009), first woman president of a bank in Spain
- María Casares (1922–1996), actress
- Manolo Sanchez (born 1929), long-time valet to U.S. president Richard Nixon.
- Luis Suárez Miramontes (1935-2023), football player and manager
- Amancio Ortega, (born 1936 in Castilla y León), founder of fashion brand Zara (clothing)
- Amancio Amaro Varela (1939–2023), football player
- Trinidad Falcés (1942–2022), transgender activist
- Emilio Pérez Touriño (born 1948), former president of the Spanish autonomous community of Galicia
- Manuel Rivas Barros (born 1957), writer, poet, essayist and journalist
- Fernando Romay, (born 1959), basketball player
- María Pujalte, (born 1966), actress
- Marta Sánchez, (born 1966), singer
- Nadia Calviño (born 1968), incumbent Minister of Economy and former director-general for Budget of the European Union
- Andrés Manuel Díaz, (born 1969), athlete
- Mario Casas, (born 1986), actor
- Lucas Pérez, (born 1988), football player for Deportivo de La Coruña
- María Luisa Pérez-Soba, (1930-2021), first Galician and fifth Spanish agricultural engineer
- Iñigo Quintero, (born 2001), musician, known for his 2022 song "Si No Estás"

== International relations ==
=== Twin towns – sister cities ===
A Coruña is twinned with:

- Brest, France
- Cádiz, Spain
- Caracas, Venezuela
- Mar del Plata, Argentina
- Mariglianella, Italy
- (Republic of Ireland) Limerick, Ireland
- Recife, Brazil

== See also ==
- Celtic nations
- Celts
- Ethnic groups in Europe
- Galician music
- Galician nationalism
- Galician people
- Galician wine
- Modern Celts
- Timeline of Galician history
- Way of St. James (Camino de Santiago)
- List of municipalities in A Coruña
