= Ánxeles Penas =

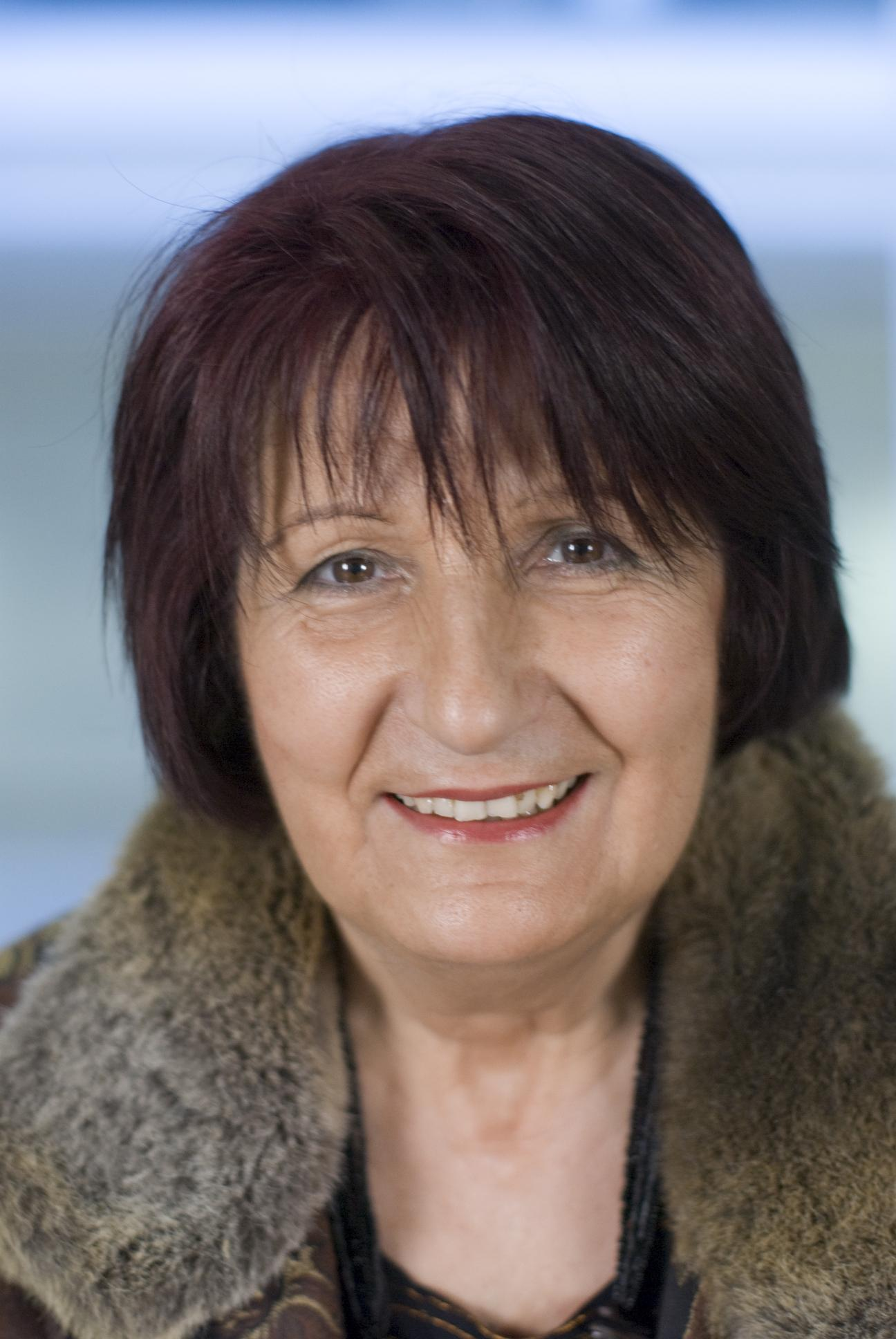
- Ánxeles Penas (2007)
- Born: Ánxeles Penas García; 5 May 1943 (age 83); Teixeiro, Curtis, Spain
- Education: University of Santiago de Compostela
- Occupation: poet
- Writing career
- Language: Spanish; Galician

Ánxeles Penas García (born 5 May 1943 in Teixeiro, Curtis, Spain) is a Spanish poet, first in Spanish and, since 1982, in Galician. She has also participated in more than 50 exhibitions as a sculptor and painter.

== Education ==
She holds a degree in Philosophy and Letters from the University of Santiago de Compostela (1970) and in Fine Arts (sculpture specialty) from the Faculty of Real Academia de Bellas Artes de San Fernando in Madrid (1986). In addition, she studied music at the Conservatorio Superior de Música de A Coruña.

== Career ==
In the plastic arts field, she has the double skill of sculptor and painter and has participated in more than fifty exhibitions. Penas founded the Experimental Art Group A Carón in 1975. She is a member of Asociación Internacional de Amigos de la Universidad Libre Iberoamericana en Galicia (AULIGA), and sits on the Advisory Council of Serta, an inter-Roman poetry magazine, which is affiliated with the National University of Distance Education.

In addition to Serta, she has collaborated with several other magazines including Zurgai, Festa da palabra silenciada, Clave Orión, Historia y vida, as well as in the Internet magazine EON MAGAZINE, and as art critic of El Ideal Gallego of Coruña, La Voz de Galicia ("Faíscas"), and El Diario de Ferrol. She has done studies of the works of Álvaro Cunqueiro, Celso Emilio Ferreiro, Rosalía de Castro, Xohana Torres, Tino Grandío, and Laxeiro.

== Awards and honours ==
- Premio, Minervais Festival of the University of Santiago, 1970.
- Premio Nacional, Jorge Manrique, 1971.
- Premio, Festival of the Song of A Coruña, 1971.
- Ribadavia Open Theater Award, 1974.
- City of A Coruña Award, 1981.

== Selected works ==
=== In Galician language ===
==== Poetry ====
- Galicia, fondo val (1982). Edicións do Castro. 72 pages. ISBN 9788474921359.
- O santuario intocable (1992). Sotelo Blanco Edicións, Col. Leliadoura. ISBN 978-8478241347.
- Perfís e poéticas (2006). Baía Edicións. 106 pages. ISBN 9788496526716.
- Antoloxía poética. Antología poética. Anthologie poétique, 2006, Espiral Maior. French translation by François Davo.
- Amor deshabitado (2008). Espiral Maior. 68 pages. ISBN 9788496475649.
- Triptico ártabro (2022). Laiovento. 86 pages. ISBN 9788484875673.

==== Collective works ====
- I Festival de Poesía no Condado 1981, S. C. D. Condado.
- IV Festival da Poesía no Condado, 1984, S. C. D. Condado.
- Escolma de poesía galega (1976-1984), 1984, Sotelo Blanco.
- V Festival da Poesia no Condado, 1985, S. C. D. Condado.
- VI Festival da Poesía no Condado, 1986, S. C. D. Condado.
- VII Festival da Poesia no Condado, 1987, S. C. D. Condado.
- IX Festival da Poesia no Condado. Escolma Poética, 1989, S. C. D. Condado.
- Fondo en malva, en Homenaxe a Miguel González Garcés, 1991, Council of A Coruña.
- XII Festival da Poesia no Condado, 1992, S. C. D. Condado.
- XIII Festival da Poesia no Condado, 1993, S. C. D. Condado.
- Amor en feminino: antoloxía das poetas galegas de Rosalía á Xeración dos 80, 2006, Baía Edicións. Edición de Maximino Cacheiro Varela.
- Poemas coruñeses: antoloxía de textos poéticos dos séculos XIX e XX sobre a Coruña, 2008, Espiral Maior.
- Cartafol de soños, homenaxe a Celso Emilio Ferreiro no seu centenario (1912-2012), 2012.
- A cidade na poesía galega do século XXI, 2012, Toxosoutos.
- 150 Cantares para Rosalía de Castro, 2015, (text).
- Os aforismos do riso futurista, 2016, Edicións Xerais.

=== In Spanish language ===
==== Poetry ====
- Con los pies en la frontera (1976).
- Ya soy para tu muerte (1980).

==== Prose ====
- Abelenda. Grandes pintores (2008). Council of A Coruña. 256 pages. ISBN 9788498120790.

==== Translations ====
- Cantos caucanos, of Antón Avilés de Taramancos (2000). Espiral Maior. In Galician and Spanish.
- Antología poética, of Eusebio Lorenzo Baleirón (2000). Espiral Maior. In Galician and Spanish.
