= Carolina Casanova de Cepeda =

Spanish dramatic soprano

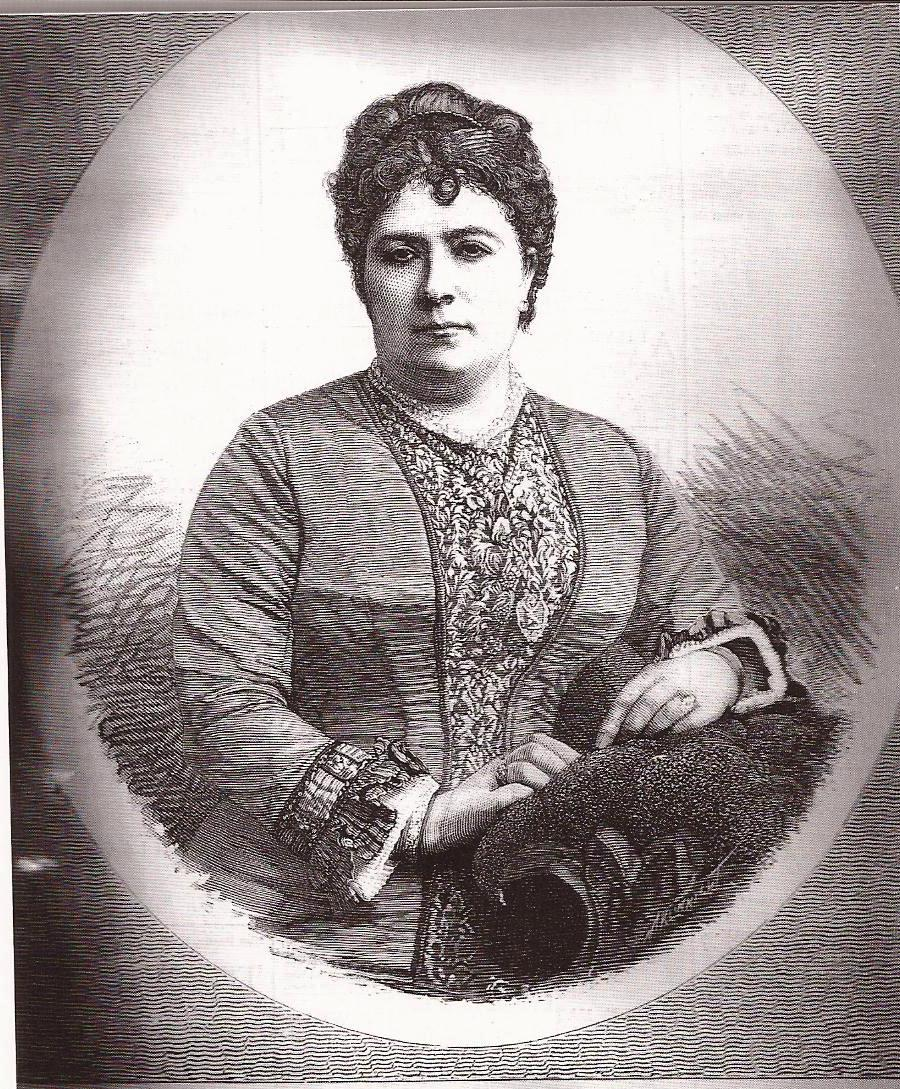

Background information
- Born: January 10, 1847; Ferrol, Spain
- Died: February 8, 1910 (aged 63) Madrid, Spain
- Genres: Opera
- Occupation: Soprano

Carolina Casanova Rodríguez (10 January 1847 – 8 February 1910), known professionally as Carolina de Cepeda or simply La Cepeda, was a Spanish dramatic soprano, considered the best in her field during the latter half of the nineteenth century. Little is known about her early life in Ferrol, Spain, until she began studying music under Francisco Piñeiro, director of the Teatro Filarmónico de Ferrol (Ferrol Philharmonic Theatre). She was among the first Spanish sopranos to gain international acclaim in Europe.

She performed in some of the world's most prestigious opera houses, such as the Teatro di San Carlo in Naples, London's Royal Opera House, and La Scala in Milan, and performed in the world premiere of Ciro Pinsuti's The Merchant of Venice at the Teatro Comunale di Bologna.

After her performing career, Carolina Casanova became a professor at the Escuela Nacional de Música y Declamación, now known as the Madrid Royal Conservatory, where she worked with significant figures in Spanish opera.

The day she died, the Conservatory opened its doors for students and teachers to pay their last respects. Some newspapers described her passing as "una pérdida irreparable [an irreparable loss]" for Spanish art.

== Career ==
=== Early life and training ===
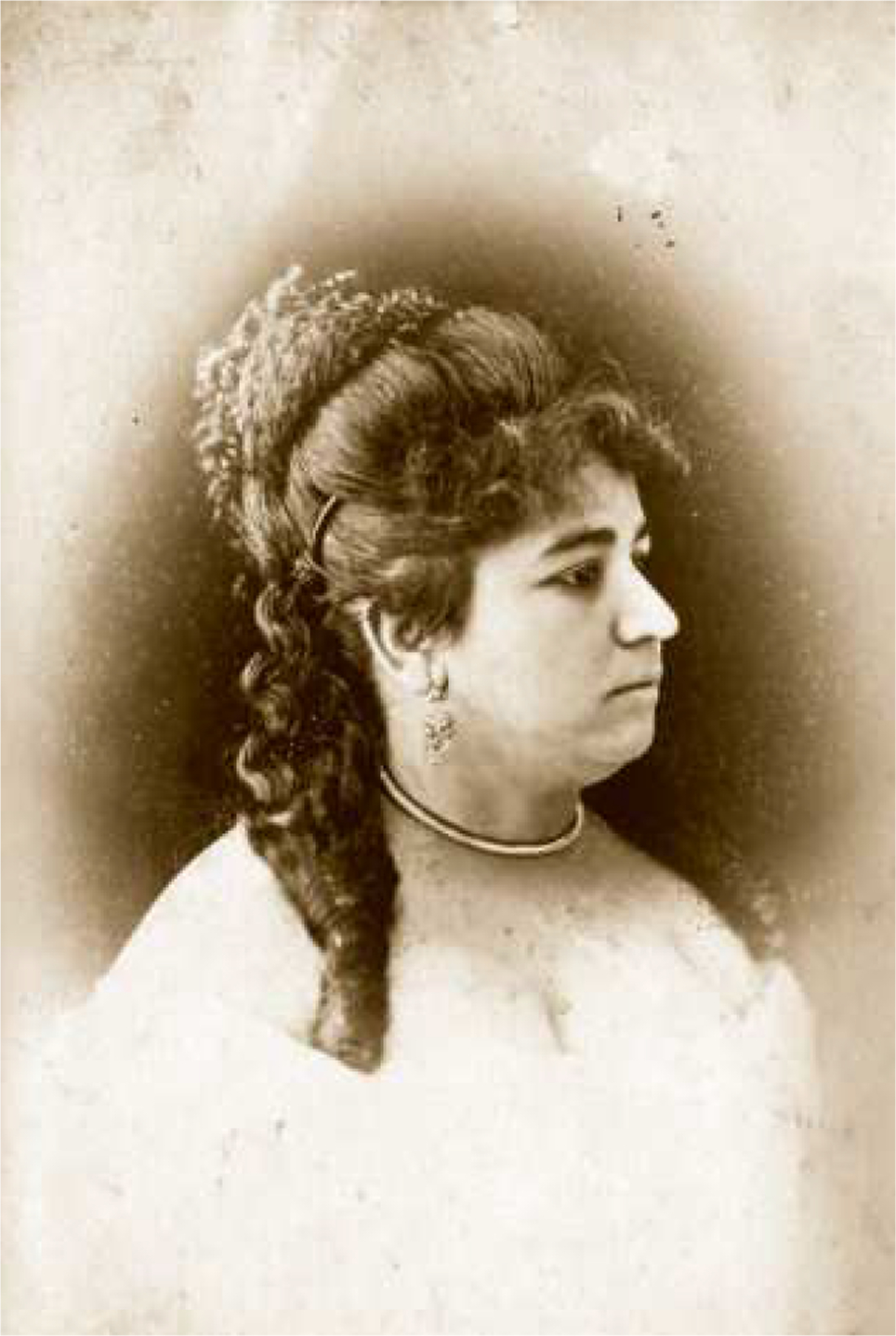
Carolina Casanova de Cepeda in Barcelona

María Carolina Casanova Rodríguez was born 10 January 1847 in the Esteiro neighborhood of Ferrol, as the fourth daughter of Rosa Rodríguez da Veiga and Luis Casanova Pérez.^{[MP]}

From the registers of 1840–1853, it is known that she lived on San Nicolao Street. Also, it has been deduced from the registers of Ferrol that her father was stationed in other cities and the approximate date of her father's death can be determined from these documents describing Rosa Rodríguez da Veiga as a widow in 1852. Little else is known of her childhood or adolescence in Ferrol, except that her family moved away in 1853.^{[MP]}

Nothing is known about her music studies until her adolescence, when she studied with the maestro Francisco Piñeiro, senior musician of the Departamento de Mariña de Ferrol and director of the Teatro Filarmónico.^{[MP]} It was at this precise theater in Ferrol where she made her debut in 1863, at age 16.^{[JB]}

Her debut came about by chance; Piñeiro needed someone to fill in for his first soprano, and he was introduced to the young woman who had a reputation for her beautiful voice but no public singing experience. After her performance was a success, Piñeiro gave her wreaths of flowers and reportedly told her:^{[MP]}

Todas las noches antes de acostarse contemplará usted bien estas coronas, que recibió sin merecerlas; usted posee dotes suficientes para llegar algún día a obtenerlas bien merecidas.[Every night before you go to bed, you will think about these wreaths that you were given without deserving them; you possess the talents to one day receive them, well-deserved.]^{[MP]}

Through Piñeiro's own intervention, who was already looking ahead towards Cepeda's future musical career, she secured a soprano role in an opera company that was visiting the city, led by Macucci, who agreed to add her to his company, taking her under his and his wife's wing. A few months later, she performed with that same company in the Teatro de la Zarzuela,^{[JB]} where she began to establish a reputation in the genre.^{[MP]} In the Madrid theater she sang in the chorus alongside a young Julián Gayarre, and possibly met her future husband, Luis Rodríguez Cepeda, a composer and director of orchestras and choirs, who was twice her age; the two would marry in 1866.^{[JB]} Although the date of her wedding remains unknown, the December 1866 Revista de Bellas Artes refers to "Señora Cepeda" (using her married surname) as the principal soprano contracted for the lyric opera company of Palma de Mallorca.

Carolina Casanova continued her training in Rome, where she studied theater. Subsequently, in Paris, she studied solfège and singing, temporarily living with family in the Parisian district Auteuil at various points. In the French capital, Cepeda had her first son, Luís, on 21 April 1869.^{[MP]}

=== First tours ===
After her acclaimed professional debut in Palma de Mallorca in Verdi's Rigoletto,^{[JB]} she signed with the Teatro Principal de València.^{[MP]} Madrid magazine La Escena reported on this, writing, "[the Valencian theater assembled a company, both for ordinary functions as well as extraordinary, like they never had in Valencia]" Carolina Casanova was one of the four prime donne engaged by the theater, along with three tenors, two baritones, two basses, and seven supporting singers. In Valencia she sang, among other works, Un ballo in maschera by Giuseppe Verdi and Robert le diable by Giacomo Meyerbeer. This same year she had her first contact with the Gran Teatre del Liceu to participate in a concert alongside students of the maestro Marià Obiols.^{[MP]}

Immediately afterward, she began a tour of Latin America and northern Europe.^{[MP]} After touring the principal theaters of the Americas, she had great success in Costa Rica in 1869, where the audience escorted her home while showering her with ovations. The soprano from Ferrol achieved success in Gothenburg, Sweden, as noted by the newspaper La Iberia in October. A few months later, in April 1870, the daily Madrid newspaper La Época published Cepeda's French accolades just as she was returning to Spain from Brazil. That same year, she also appeared in the Italian city of Avellino, singing Il trovatore by Verdi.^{[MP]}

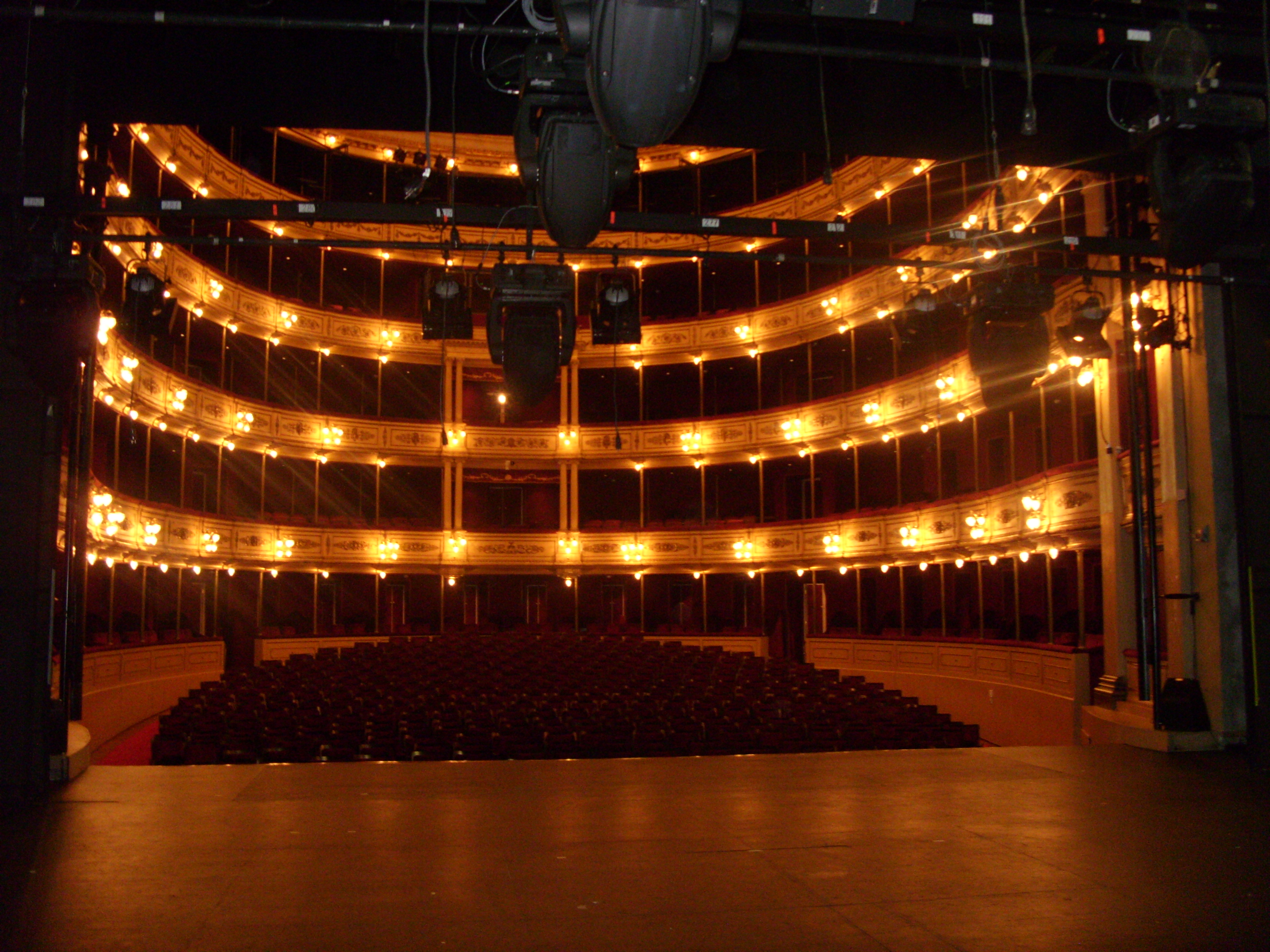
Solís Theatre (interior)

During her early tours, the Galician soprano visited Denmark, Peru, Chile, Argentina, and Uruguay. She performed in prominent theaters such as the Theatro D. Pedro II in Brazil, the Teatro Manuel Ascencio Segura in Lima, and the Uruguayan Solís Theatre in Ciudad Vieja, Montevideo.^{[MP]}

It was precisely in the latter theater where Carolina Casanova left a lasting impression, so much so that after decades passed she was remembered with fond nostalgia by the city's music press, especially in the Montevideo Musical. She remained at the Teatro Solís for an extended season from April to September in 1872, where she sang The Barber of Seville by Rossini, along with La traviata, Rigoletto, and Un ballo in maschera by Verdi, in addition to Bellini's La sonnambula as well as Linda di Chamounix and Poliuto by Italian composer Gaetano Donizetti.^{[MP]} Her arrival in Peru was documented in the press, which noted her successful debut where she sang Verdi's La traviata in May 1871, and later joined the Italian opera company alongside Spanish-Italian soprano Adelina Patti, with whom she would cross paths years later in the London Royal Opera House.

In this period of touring, she had her second child, her daughter Luisa, on 4 June 1870 in Madrid.^{[MP]}

=== Debut in Madrid ===
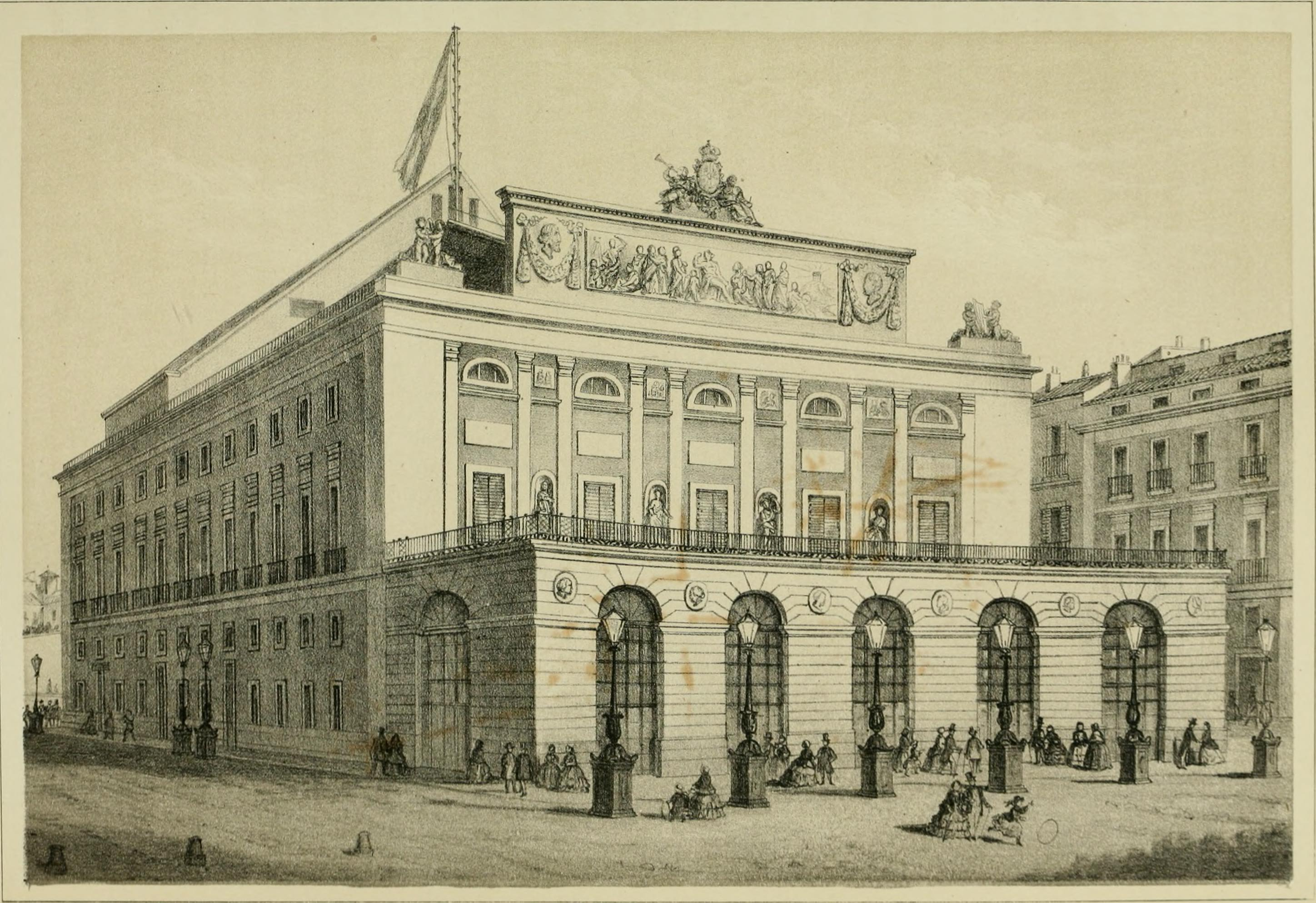
The Teatro Real in 1860

In early 1873, the soprano returned to Spain. In February of that year, the Madrid newspaper La Correspondencia de España reported her arrival with her husband, highlighting the success she had achieved for her work abroad with the Italian opera companies. The paper expressed interest from the Madrid public: "[Music lovers wish that the company of our Opera House will provide them with the pleasure to hear such a celebrated artist, according to the foreign and American press.]" In this report the name of Carolina Casanova appears before that of her husband, possibly indicating that she had eclipsed him in fame.

She made her debut in the Teatro Real (formerly the Teatro Nacional de la Ópera) in Vincenzo Bellini's Norma on 12 March 1873. She also participated in the performances of Giuseppe Verdi's La traviata on the 23rd and 25th, as well as the premiere of Filippo Marchetti's Ruy Blas on the 29th.^{[MP]}

The press in the Spanish capital was divided regarding her debut. While Galicia Moderna, La Iberia, and La Época echoed the triumph on the Madrid stage, with La Época pointing out that after her performance of the aria "Casta Diva", she was called back onstage twice. In contrast, other contemporary reviews were not so positive: music and bullfighting critic Luis Carmena y Millán described Carolina Casanova's performance as a "mal éxito [poor success]". The harshest criticism came from La Moda elegante, where Marqués de Valle-Alegre concluded, "La Cepeda podrá ocupar un honroso puesto en el teatro de la Ópera, pero no el principal... [La Cepeda can occupy an honorable position in the Opera House, but not the main one...]"^{[MP]} The criticism may have resulted in her decision not to return to the Teatro Real for over a decade.^{[JB]}

Whatever the case, the soprano did not sing again in the Teatro Real until 1885—when she reprised her original Madrid performance of Norma—after a prestigious international career. The following year, she performed at the Teatro Jovellanos and the Conservatorio and then left for Italy.^{[MP]}

=== International success ===
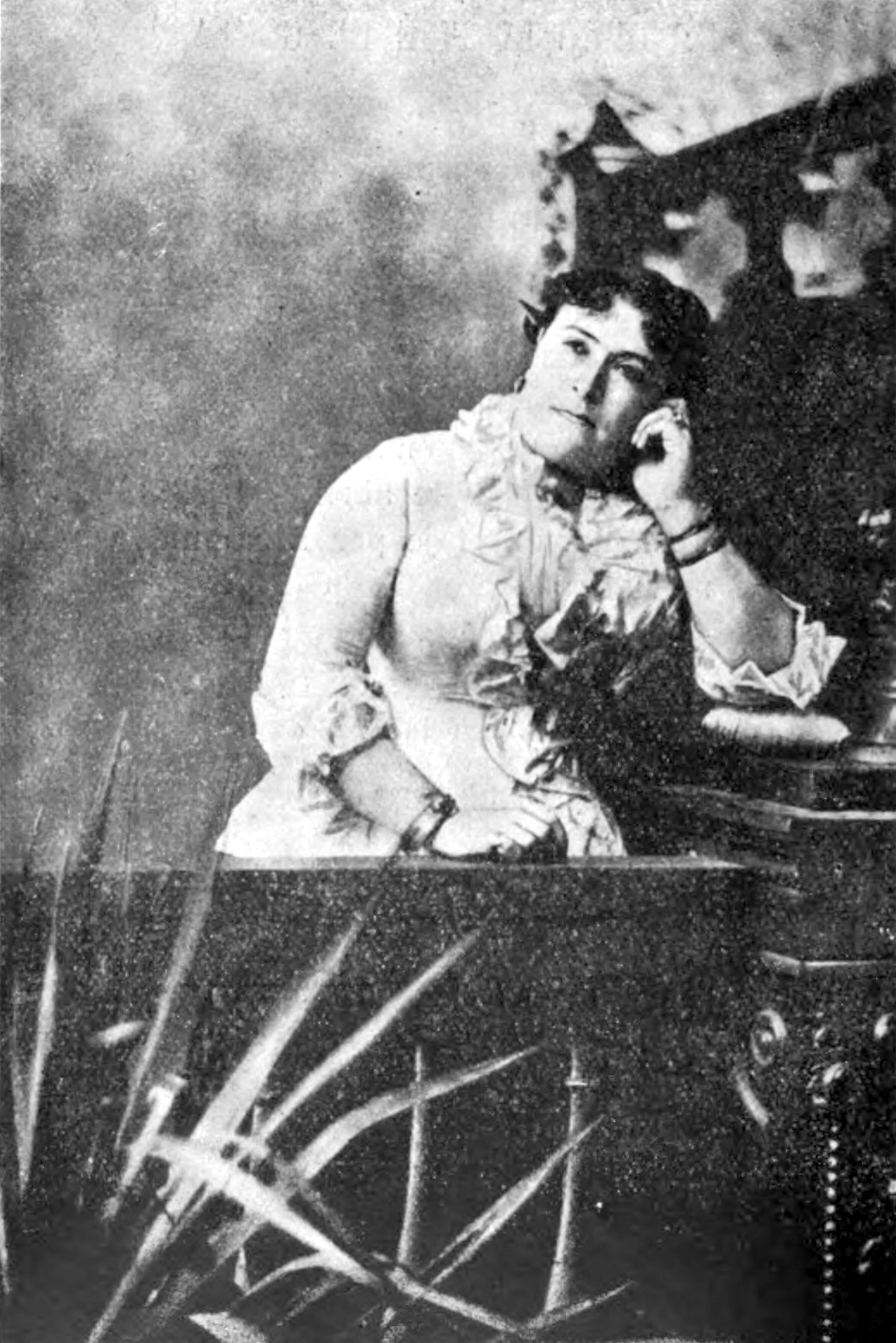
Portrait of Carolina Casanova

In September 1873, Carolina Casanova received a warm welcome at her debut at the Teatro Dal Verme in Milan, Italy.^{[MP]} On 8 November, she played the role of Portia in the first production of Ciro Pinsuti's Il mercante di Venezia (an adaptation of Shakespeare's The Merchant of Venice) in the Teatro Comunale di Bologna. She returned to the stage later that year, on 5 December, and in January, she appeared in Achille Montuoro's Il re Manfredi and Giuseppe Verdi's Un ballo in maschera.^{[MP]}

During these years, she also performed at the Warsaw Grand Theater in Poland, where she took the main role in the theater's Polish premiere of Aida.^{[PM]}^{[MP]}

In 1876, the soprano was engaged to sing Verdi's Requiem Mass at the Teatro Regio in Parma, and was awarded a gold medal for her work. The performance was conducted by Franco Faccio, and the concert was attended by future King of Italy, Umberto of Savoy, and his wife Margherita of Savoy.^{[PM]} Later that year, Carolina Casanova made her debut at the Liceu in Barcelona. She performed at the Liceu between December 1876 and March 1877, most notably in the theater's premiere of Verdi's Aida alongside Italian tenor Francesco Tamagno on February 25, 1877, six years after its world premiere in Cairo.^{[MP]} Her second season in Barcelona stood out even more, when she gave a highly acclaimed performance as Lucrezia Borgia alongside Julián Gayarre. Carolina Casanova performed in Lisbon with the opera company of the Real Teatro, where she debuted in Fromental Halévy's L'Ebrea and sang in Donizetti's Maria di Rohan, Gounod's Faust, Il trovatore, Ernani, Un ballo in maschera, and Verdi's Aida.^{[MP]}

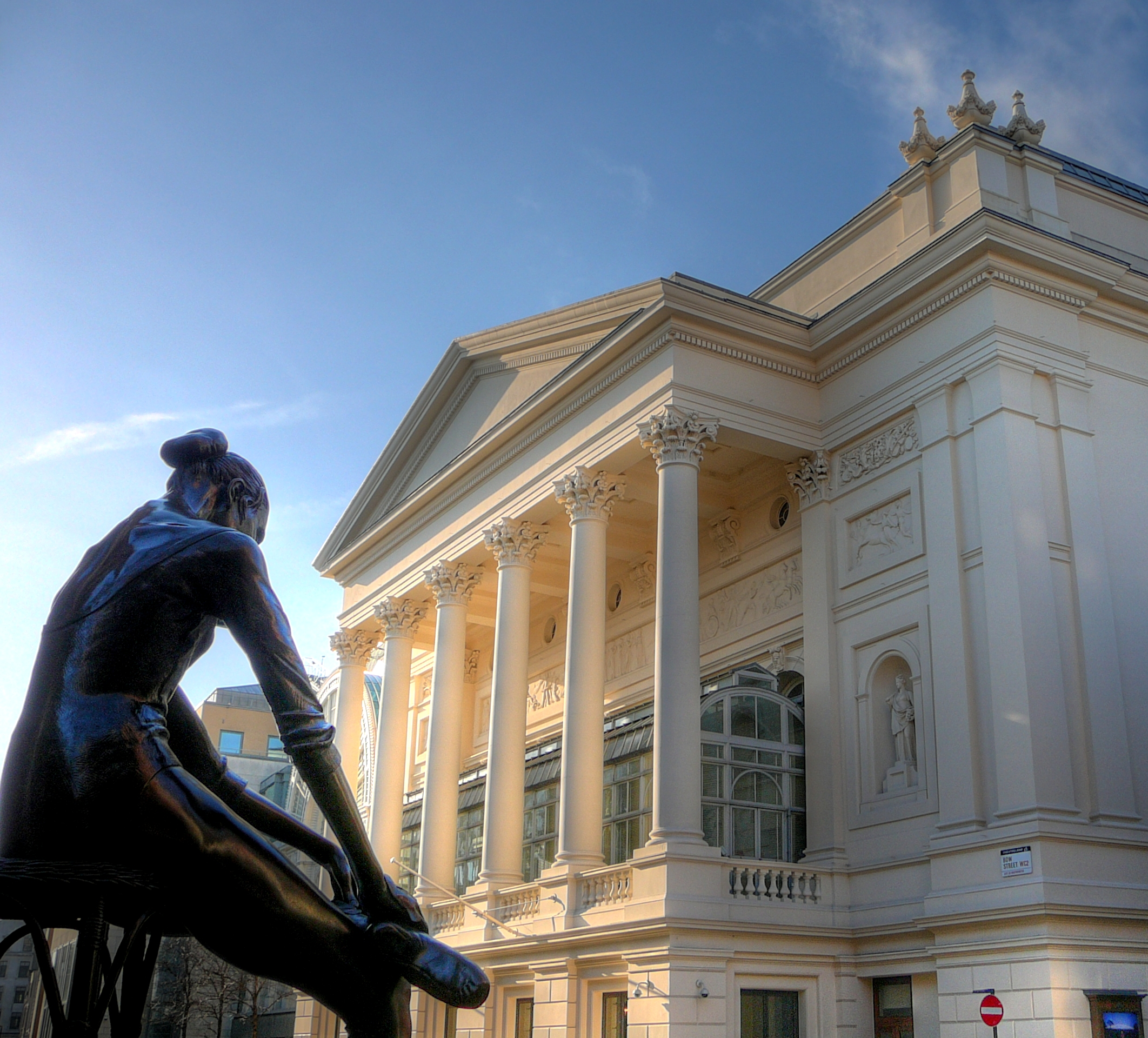
London's Royal Opera House, where Carolina Casanova sang during the 1878 and 1879 seasons

In 1878, she joined the Royal Italian Opera, directed by Frederick Gye, at the Royal Opera House in London. A successful first season led Carolina Casanova to perform again at Covent Garden in 1879, alternating with Adelina Patti in the second season, singing dramatic roles in Meyerbeer's Les Huguenots and Robert le diable, Wagner's Tannhäuser, Donizetti's Lucrezia Borgia, Mozart's Don Giovanni and Le nozze di Figaro, and Bellini's Norma. The London press highlighted the audience's warm reception and praised Carolina Casanova's professionalism. In those two seasons, the Galician soprano shared the stage with Navarrese tenor Julián Gayarre, with whom she would perform on numerous occasions throughout her career. The second London season ended with Norma, about which Julio Enciso wrote for the Havana-based Basque-language newspaper Ir-rac-bat, and which was syndicated by Galicia Modern: "It was the artistic crowning achievement that capped off the glory of Carolina Cepeda, winning her the title of a celebrated figure in the opinion of the press and the public."^{[MP]}

In October 1878, Carolina Casanova performed in Russia with the Saint Petersburg Imperial troupe, as reported by Crónica Musical. Early the next year, Madrid’s La Época listed her among the company’s prima donnas, noting the Russian press’s acclaim.^{[MP]} La Época wrote that she was regarded as an "artista de primer orden [artist of the first order]" receiving "[more than 20 curtain calls]" each performance. Her manager during this period was José Lago González, a Coruña-born impresario known as "Bismarck the Galician," who later served as artistic director of the Imperial Theatres of St. Petersburg and Moscow.^{[JB]} She also added Don Giovanni to her repertoire and performed Marina and three new works by Navarrese composer Emilio Arrieta in London and possibly St. Petersburg.^{[MP]}

In the early 1880s, the Spanish press again reported on the presence of Carolina Casanova in Italy; the Madrid newspaper Crónica de la música noted that she was contracted in 1880 by the Teatro di San Carlo in Naples to sing in Aida and Lohengrin, performing 26 times in Naples and was considered a remarkable success by the press of the time. The following year, Carolina Casanova returned to Milan, on that occasion to sing at La Scala, where she received a resounding ovation for her performance of La traviata, as well as a serenade from the theater's orchestra, before a large crowd of admirers escorted her from the theater. She would return to the Lombard capital's theater in 1887.^{[MP]}

El Correo Gallego, writing in 1930, looked back on one of the final performances of the autumn season, on 11 February 1880, in St. Petersburg, in which Carolina Casanova performed the lead role in Lucrezia Borgia, receiving thunderous applause and an invitation to the Tsars' private box.

During the 1881–1882 season, she formed part of the Italian lyric company that performed at the Liceu and was known as the Prima donna assoluta soprano drammatica. El Correo Gallego noted in its 5 October 1881 issue that for the winter season, the diva would earn 45,000 Spanish duros, equivalent to $1,441,000 in 2025.

Carolina Casanova returned to Russia in 1884, after signing a contract to sing in Moscow following the end of the season at the Liceu and a performance of Lucrezia Borgia in Paris with Julián Gayarre, with the writer Alexandre Dumas fils in attendance. She lived for many seasons in the French capital, and the Spanish press made frequent references to her trips to Paris after performances and tours.^{[MP]} Spanish newspapers also reported curious facts about her life.^{[MP]}

In 1889, newspapers such as La Monarquía and La Correspondencia reported on Carolina Casanova's participation in private gatherings hosted by the former Spanish queen Isabella II at her Parisian palace. In 1884, Madrid newspaper La Correspondencia de España noted the presence of Carolina Casanova and Julián Gayarre in La Coruña, but did not report whether the two performed together. At this time, it was common to find the press reporting Carolina Casanova in Culleredo, a place frequented by the bourgeoisie and aristocracy on their summer retreats. The soprano herself bought a home in the region.^{[MP]}

In 1886, she was once again performing at Covent Garden in London. That year, La Correspondencia reported that Carolina Casanova had been hired again by the London theater, where she sang in Semiramide, before returning to St. Petersburg to open both the Fall season and Carnival with the opera Norma. Her performances earned her further success, and the critic from Diario de San Petersburgo compared her with Giuditta Pasta, whose Norma was considered the model for the time.

The 1887–88 season was the last in which Carolina Casanova performed at the Liceu, coinciding with the 1888 Barcelona Universal Exposition. There, she once again excelled as Valentine in Les Huguenots in May, Lohengrin in June and, finally, Lucrezia Borgia.^{[MP]}

== Later career ==
=== Teaching at the Conservatory ===
While Carolina Casanova was still capable of performing in 1889, she began to reduce her concerts, ultimately retiring from the stage in 1893. Two factors that may have contributed to her retirement and transition to teaching were the deaths of Julián Gayarre and her husband.^{[MP]}

The soprano maintained a fruitful professional relationship with Gayarre, and presumably a personal friendship. Not long after they performed on stage at Bilbao, the tenor collapsed on 8 December 1889 during a performance of Les Pêcheurs de Perles at the Teatro Real. After a few days, he died on 2 January 1890 in Madrid.

Shortly after Gayarre fell ill, her husband died unexpectedly on 15 December 1889. When her former teacher Jorge Ronconi died not long after, Carolina Casanova applied for his position at the Madrid Royal Conservatory.^{[MP]} The director himself gave her a favorable report, and she was brought on as a temporary instructor on 14 July 1891. The following year, she was appointed to a permanent position as professor and chair of the singing department. She was the first woman in the school's history to hold this position.

In 1891, she sang Norma and Les Huguenots in the Teatro Nacional São João in Porto and participated in a benefit concert for victims of the fire in Ribera de Curtidores at Madrid's Teatro del Príncipe Alfonso, performed before the Spanish Royal Family. A few months later, she took part in a concert organized by the Conservatory to provide aid for the damage done by the floods in Toledo and Almería. That year, on 14 July, the Conservatory hired Carolina Casanova based on her credentials. Barcelona newspaper La Dinastía wrote of her appointment:

Fue nombrada profesora de canto de la Escuela Nacional de Música y Declamación, la célebre tiple dramática española doña Carolina Casanova de Cepeda. Consideramos acertadísimo este nombramiento, que viene a ser justo premio al talento indiscutible de una eminente artista española. Indudablemente ganará mucho la enseñanza en dicha escuela, con tan buena maestra. [Carolina Casanova de Cepeda, the famed Spanish soprano, was named professor of singing of the Madrid Royal Conservatory. We consider this appointment to be absolutely perfect, a just reward for the undisputed talent of an eminent Spanish artist. Undoubtedly the teaching at said school will gain much, with such an excellent teacher.]

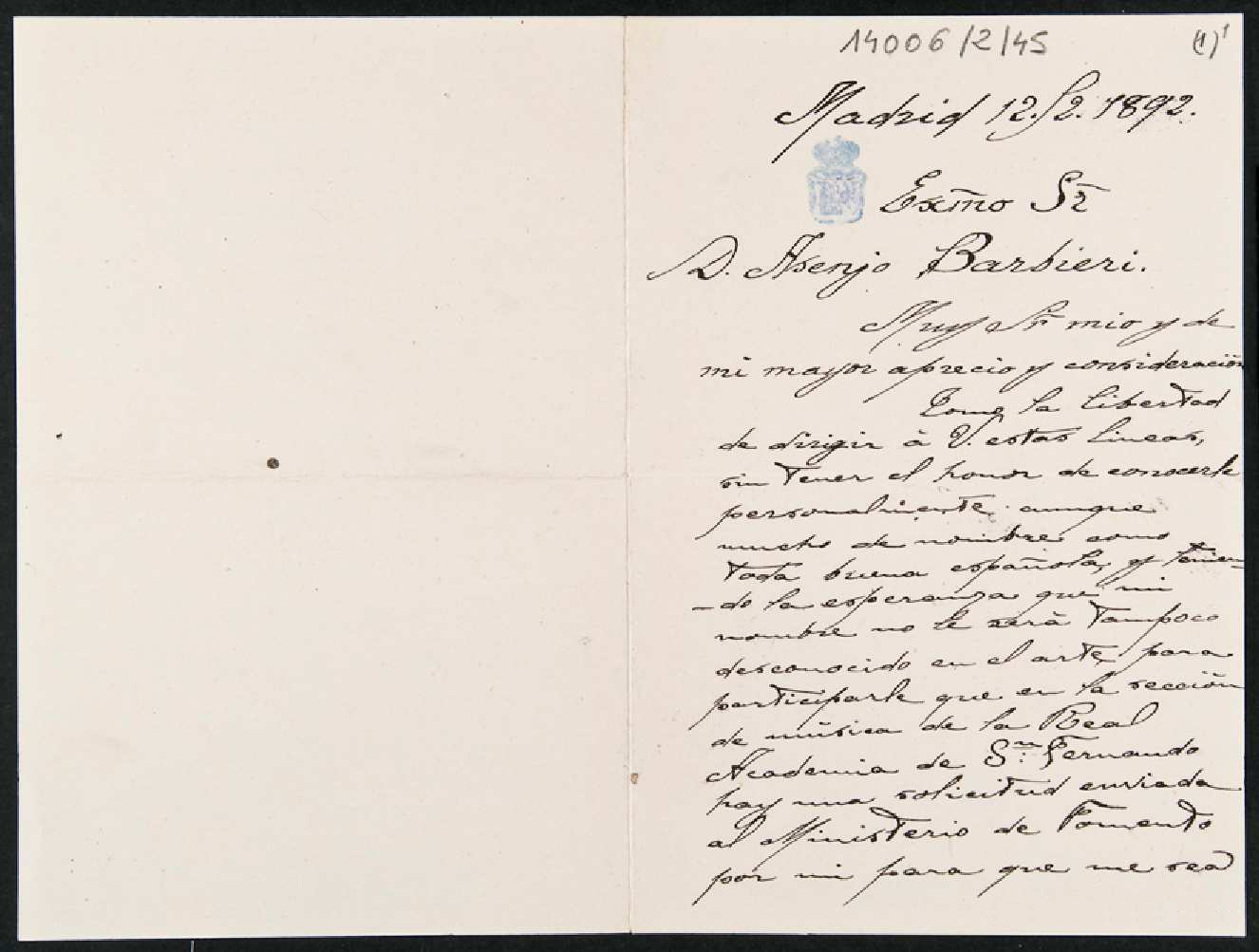
First page of the letter Carolina Casanova sent to Barbieri

However, she was initially brought on as a temporary professor with a salary of 2,000 pesetas, two-thirds less than the professorship. Carolina Casanova reapplied for a permanent position, citing the Royal Decree of 22 January that year, and requested Director Barbieri's support. On March 11, she was made a permanent professor. ^{[MP]}

In 1895, Carolina Casanova married for the second time to the tenor Miguel Campo Herbella from Rúa de Valdeorras, in the town hall of Rúa, Ourense. The marriage was short-lived, ending when she was widowed for the second time.^{[MP]}

=== Final years and death ===
Little is known about her life after her second marriage. In January 1910, she wrote to her "jefe y amigo [boss and friend]" Tomás Bretón to ask for permission to give lessons from home. She explained that she could no longer climb stairs after an attack of rheumatism. The letter pleaded, "[I promise nobody will know.]"^{[MP]}

Carolina Casanova died on 8 February 1910 in Madrid, while still a professor of singing and chair of singing at the Madrid Conservatory. The following day, a chapel was set up at the conservatory so that faculty and students could pay their last respects and join the funeral procession. Classes had already been suspended for the final days of Carnival. Madrid newspaper La Correspondencia de España wrote that "el arte español, con la muerte de Carolina Cepeda, sufrió una pérdida irreparable [Spanish Art, with the death of Carolina Cepeda, suffered an irreparable loss]".

She was interred in the Cementerio de San Justo in Madrid, in a simple tomb bearing her name and date of birth, alongside other family members. Her grave is in the Patio de Santa Gertrudis courtyard, where the composers Federico Chueca and Ruperto Chapí along with Carolina Casanova's predecessor at the conservatory Jorge Ronconi were also buried.^{[MP]}

== Reception ==
Descriptions of Carolina Casanova's singing were published in the contemporary press. They compliment her consistency, her musical gifts, her flexibility, and her vocal range, as well as her physical attributes and stage presence from the beginning of her career. In 1869, the newspaper La Iberia described her singing in the following manner: "La señora Cepeda posee una magnífica voz, de gran extensión y muy simpática; su canto es correcto y su estilo de buena escuela [Señora Cepeda possesses a magnificent voice, of great range and very pleasant; her singing is sound and her style shows excellent training]". Following her debut in the Teatro Real, the newspaper La Época praised her "beautiful" voice and "excellent" figure, predicted a bright future ahead for her.^{[MP]}

In her time, Carolina Casanova was compared with Italian singer Giulia Grisi, one of the most highly regarded sopranos of the century. Reporting on the Ferrol soprano's British debut, on 13 July 1878, The New York Times referred to her in this way:^{[MP]}

A new singer has appeared in London, at the Royal Italian Opera, Mlle. Cepeda, who assumed the difficult character of Valentine in the "Huguenots." Her gifts are compared to those of Grisi. She has rare personal beauty, a pure and highly-cultivated voice, and dramatic instinct of the highest order.

Additionally, the Italian press highlighted her voice and stage talents. In Naples, the newspaper Sferza wrote:^{[MP]}

[From the moment Carolina Casanova steps on stage, the audience knows that they have before them a great artist. Her figure is imposing. Her gestures are sculptural. What can we say about her voice? Sometimes soft, sometimes sweet, sometimes vibrant and strong, ...]

During one of her visits to the Bolshoi Theatre, Saint Petersburg, Carolina Casanova was also compared with Giuditta Pasta, another of the great sopranos of the time.

Enrique Sánchez Torres described the singer from Ferrol as a complete singer and singled out her performance of Giacomo Meyerbeer's operas; in 1891, in Nueve músicos clásicos y seis artistas españoles, he described her as one of those people who, "fill the theater ... Everything about her was exuberant: her voice, her figure, her artistry..."^{[MP]}

== Repertoire ==
Even though Carolina Casanova primarily performed Italian opera, her repertoire also included French, German, and Spanish opera. Possibly some portion of the operas that she performed in other languages were Italian versions of those operas, as sources refer to them by their Italian titles. Among the operas in her repertoire were:^{[PM]}

- La sonnambula (Bellini)
- Norma (Bellini)
- Les Huguenots (Meyerbeer)
- Robert le diable as Roberto il diavolo (Meyerbeer)
- L’Africaine (Meyerbeer)
- La traviata (Verdi)
- Aida (Verdi)
- Il trovatore (Verdi)
- Ernani (Verdi)
- Rigoletto (Verdi)
- Un ballo in maschera (Verdi)
- Ruy Blas (Marchetti)
- Faust (Charles Gounod)
- Le nozze di Figaro (Mozart)
- Don Giovanni (Mozart)
- Lohengrin (Wagner)
- Tannhäuser (Wagner)
- Il barbiere di Siviglia (Rossini)
- Semiramide (Rossini)
- Le duc d’Albe as Il duca d’Alba (Donizetti)
- Maria di Rohan (Donizetti)
- Linda di Chamounix (Donizetti)
- Poliuto (Donizetti)
- Don Pasquale (Donizetti)
- Lucrezia Borgia (Donizetti)
- Il re Manfredi (Montuoro)
- La Juive as L’Ebrea (Halévy)
- Mefistofele (Boito)
- Guzmán el Bueno (Tomás Bretón)
- Los amantes de Teruel (Tomás Bretón)

== Legacy ==
In her time, Carolina Casanova received acclaim at the theaters where she performed. Written tributes were published in the areas where she toured. For example, Brazilian writer and painter Joaquina Navarro de Cunha e Menezes—daughter of José Félix da Cunha Meneses the baron of Rio Vermelho—wrote a tribute dedicated to "la distinguida prima donna ... intérprete sublime camino de la gloria [the distinguished prima donna ... a sublime performer on the path to glory]".^{[MP]}

Emilia Calé, a writer from A Coruña and mother of the famous pianist Emilia Quintero Calé, dedicated a poem to the soprano: "Á la célebre diva Carolina Casanova de Cepeda". The poem was written for a party that the soprano was throwing in her country home in Vilaboa, Culleredo, where the mother and daughter read the piece aloud and performed compositions on the piano. "Á la célebre" was published that same year in Madrid by El Correo de la Moda. One stanza read:

Spanish

Tú cantas, y las aves que trinan en la selva
suspenden sus cantares al escuchar tu voz;
guiadas del reclamo de tu divino acento,
hasta tu planta vuelan en su girar veloz.

— Emilia Calé
Translation:
English

You sing, and the birds that trill in the forest
Suspend their songs when they hear your voice;
Guided by the call of your divine tone,
They fly down to your feet in their swift spirals.

In 1905, a complete method of singing by the Marqués de Altavilla, a professor at the Royal Conservatory, was published. In addition to singing techniques and methods, it dedicates several pages to the most famous singers of the time, among which he mentions Carolina Casanova.

Despite the fame and respect she received during her lifetime and fond remembrances after her death, Carolina Casanova was largely forgotten in both the world of opera and her hometown. Much of her life and professional career went undocumented, ^{[MP]} and no recordings of her voice survive. In recent years, attention to overlooked women in 19th-century opera has led to reassessment of her artistic importance. In 2025, Carolina Casanova was one of several women proposed by Rosa Millán as candidates to have local streets named after them in Ferrol, to increase female representation in the city's public toponymy and public memory.
