= William V. Martin =

British diplomat

William V. Martin (born c. 1870s), also known by the Hispanicized version of his name Guillermo V. Martin, was a British Citizen and British Vice-Consul in Ferrol. Even though he was English by birth and nationality he spent most of his life in Ferrol where he took an active part in the life of the city and its Naval Shipyards; contributing to the establishment of different institutions, many of which, still exist today like the Racing Ferrol Football Club, El Circulo Mercantil de Ferrol and the Cocina Económica de Ferrol.

He was the first President of El Circulo Mercantil de Ferrol, founded 1916.

He died in Ferrol at the age of 98.

== See also ==
- William V. Martin, Lloyd's Register Agent in Ferrol, Northwestern Spain, late 19th century and early 20th century.
