= Cabo Prior Lighthouse =

Lighthouse in Spain

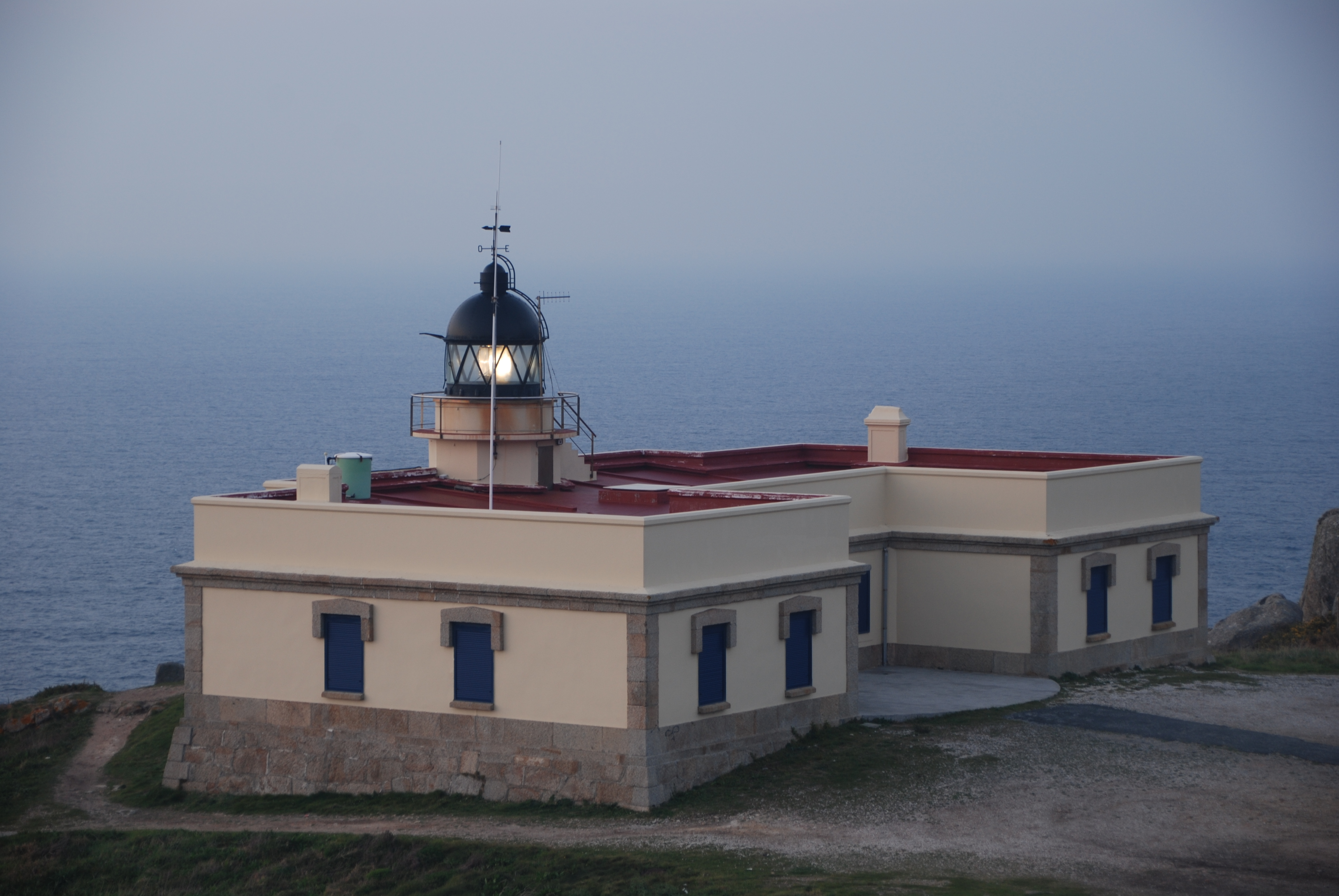
- Cabo Prior Lighthouse in 2017
- Location: Province of A Coruña, Galicia, Spain
- Coordinates: 43.56761°N 8.31453°W

Tower
- Constructed: 1853
- Construction: stone
- Height: 8 metres (26 ft)
- Operator: Ferrol Port Authority

Light
- Focal height: 107 metres (351 ft)
- Range: 22 nautical miles (41 km; 25 mi)
- Characteristic: L 0 3 oc 5 7 L 0 3 oc 2 7 L 0 3 oc 5 7

Cabo Prior Lighthouse (Spanish: Faro de Cabo Prior) is an active 19th century Spanish lighthouse located on the cabo, or cape, of the same name in the parish of San Martiño de Covas in the Ferrol municipality of the Province of A Coruña, Galicia. The lighthouse has been constructed on a high coastal clifftop, some 14 kilometres (8.7 mi) northwest of Ferrol. A set of steps descends from the lighthouse down the steep cliff to a viewpoint overlooking the Atlantic Ocean.

== History ==
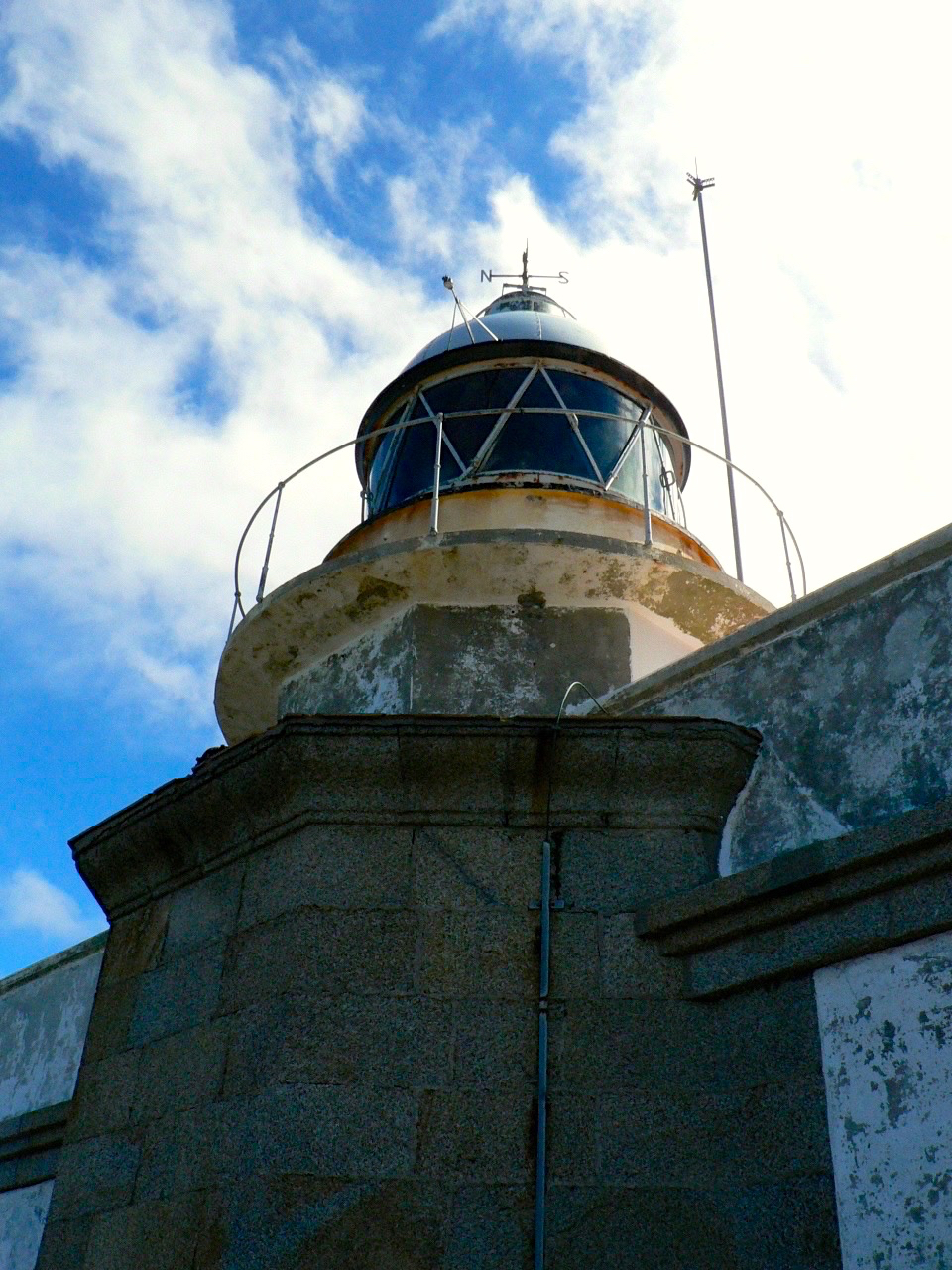
Detail of the tower from 2006

Although the modern lighthouse was not built until the 19th century, the geographers of antiquity took notice of the granite protuberance off the northwesternmost point of Iberia which, as described by Strabo and other classical geographers, was used even then as a reference point for the end of the Iberian Peninsula in the Atlantic north. It is still used today by the Spanish Navy and on modern maps.

In Roman times, around the 1st century BC, parts of Iberia with their rough waters were well regarded by mariners, both Phoenician and Roman, as a good place to trade in metals (like silver, gold, tin and iron) and wild horses. The rough and unpredictable dangers of the Atlantic, says Strabo, made it difficult for traders, though fortunately there was a magnificent natural port nearby with a sizeable bay to protect them and their wooden made vessels. This was the land of the Artabri (or Arrotrebae), the Portus Magnus Artabrorum (formed by the bay of Ferrol and the three rias of Ferrol, Betanzos and A Coruña).

The modern-day lighthouse itself was built in 1853, and consists of an 8-metre-high (26 ft) hexagonal tower, with lantern and gallery, built on the seaward side of a neo-classical one-storey keeper's house. The whitewashed buildings (now painted beige) are complemented by the masonry detailing and the stone tower.

A variety of equipment has been used to emit the all-important light during its history. The original 3rd order Sautter optic produced a fixed white light and was enhanced in 1904 with a system using rotating shutters to emit a 4+2 pattern that used an oil vapour lamp. A new optic was installed in 1926, taken from the lighthouse at Salou. The clockwork system was driven by a weight that would last eight hours.

It was electrified in 1974, with a new 2.25m diameter optic and a 1500 watt lamp, with Ruston generators providing electrical power. Also added was an electromagnetic vibrating foghorn emitting the Morse P letter every 25 seconds, which was audible up to seven nautical miles away.

Upon the withdrawal of the lighthouse keepers (torreros) in 1993, the foghorn was taken out of use, and a further upgrade in 1995 meant the light could to be monitored remotely from the port authority control centre. The generators were also replaced at the same time and 1000 watt halogen lamps were used as a light source. In 2007, the lighthouse buildings were renovated and painted beige with new woodwork and shutters.

== Operation ==
In conjunction with the Cabo Prioriño Lighthouse, which was built around the same time, it acts as a landfall beacon for the estuary and port at Ferrol, and that of A Coruña. With a focal height of 107 metres (351 ft) above the sea, its light can be seen for 22 nautical miles, producing a light characteristic of three flashes of white light in a one plus two pattern every fifteen seconds.

It is registered under the international Admiralty number D1692 and has the NGA identifier of 113-2460, and is managed and operated by the Ferrol Port Authority.

== See also ==
- List of lighthouses in Spain
