= Teixeiro =

Coordinates: 43°8′21.29″N 8°2′8.22″W

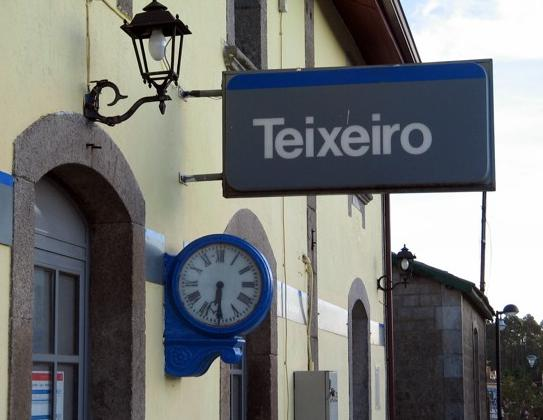
Train station of Teixeiro

Teixeiro, or Teijeiro in Spanish, is a small community located in the province of A Coruña, in the Galician region of Spain. It is part of the municipality of Curtis in the comarca of Betanzos of which it is capital.

The town hall of Curtis (Casa do Concello) is in Teixeiro as well as the Plaza de España ("Plaza of Spain").

== Notable people ==
- Ánxeles Penas (born 1943), poet
