= Endesa Termic =

Chimney in Spain

Coordinates: 43°26′29″N 7°51′45.50″W

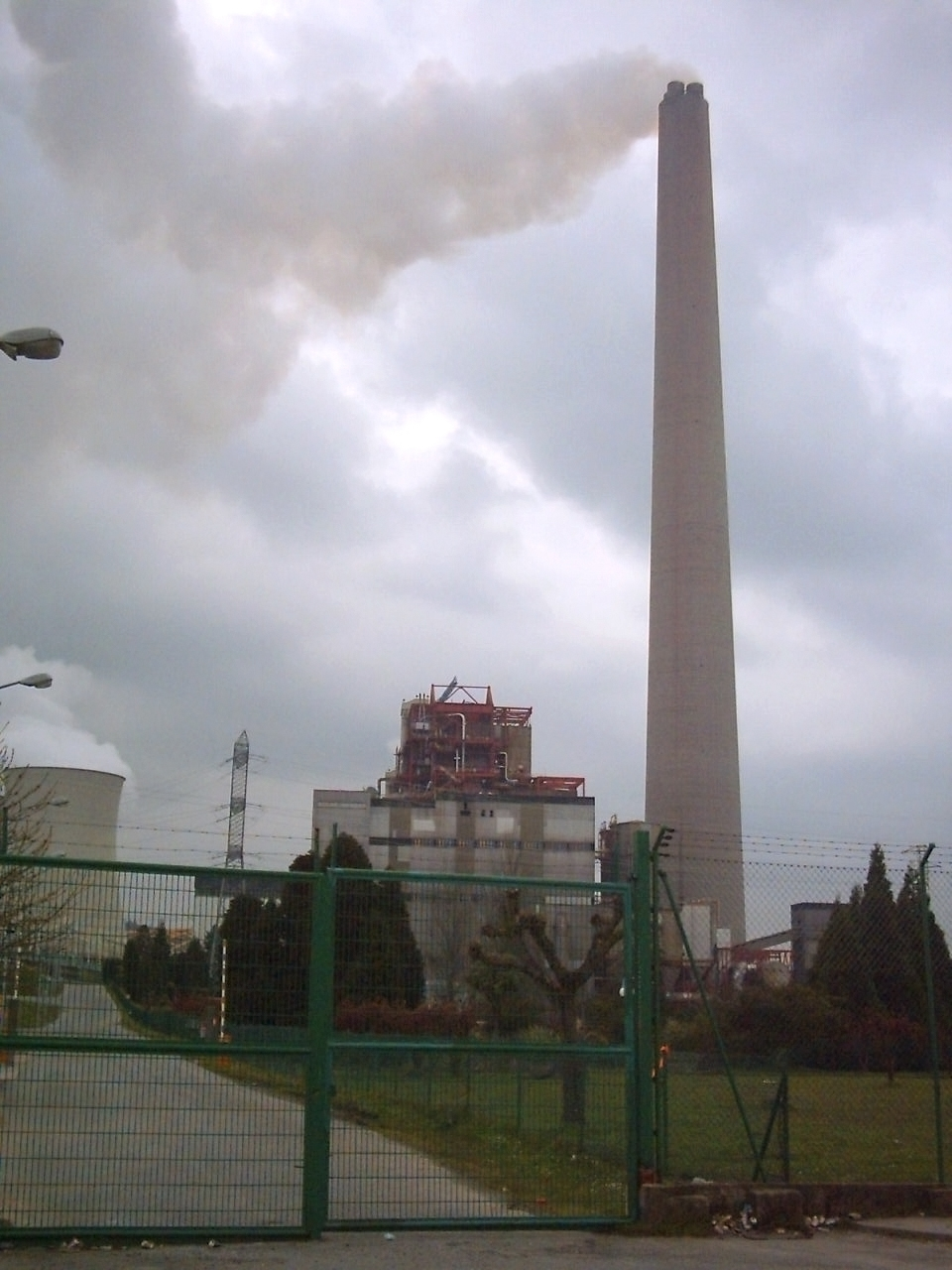
Endesa Termic

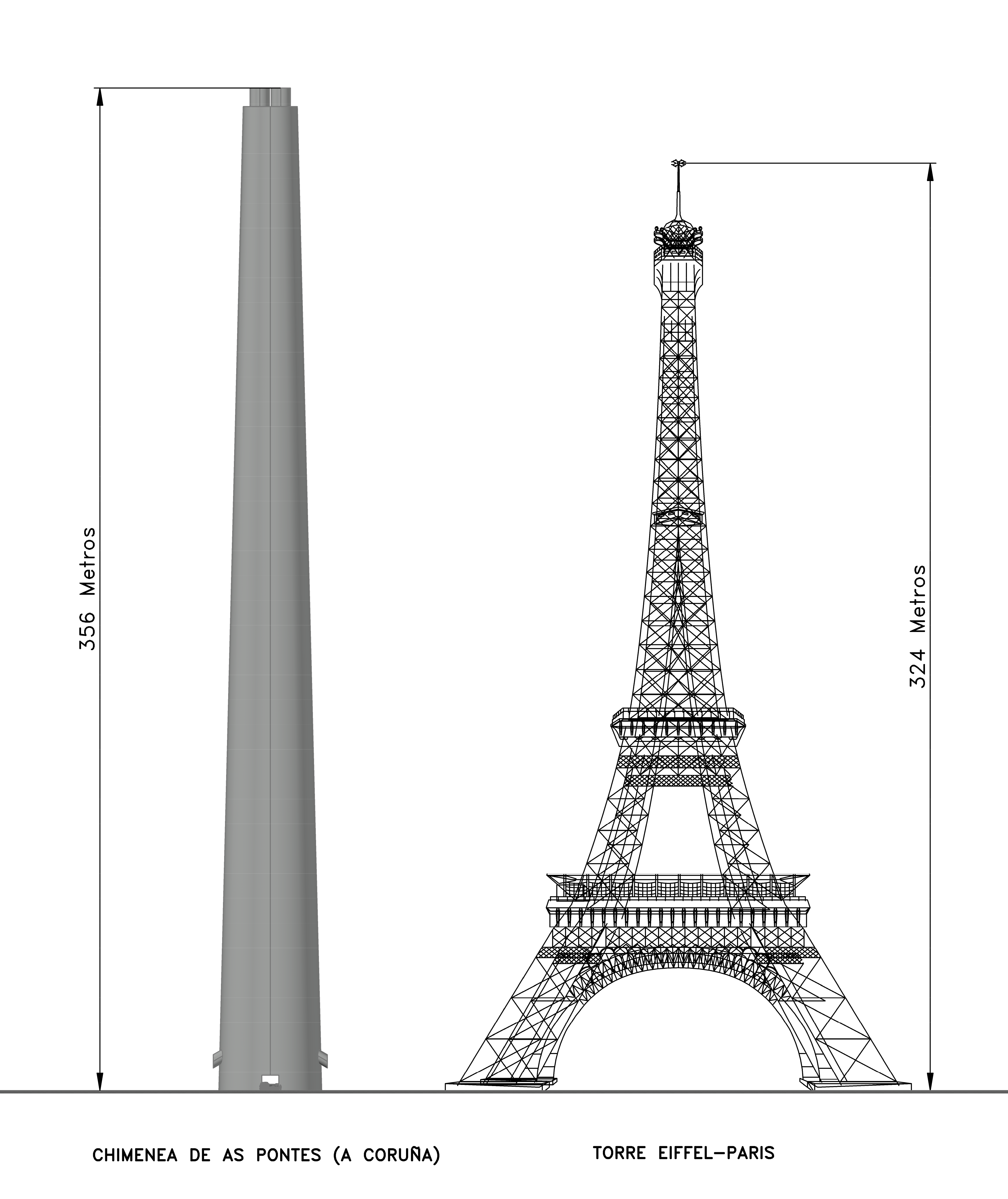
Chimney of the As Pontes power plant compared in height with the Eiffel Tower in Paris

Endesa Termic is a 356-metre-high (1,168 ft) chimney belonging to the coal power plant held by Spanish utility Endesa at As Pontes de García Rodríguez in the outskirts of Ferrol in the province of A Coruña, north-western Spain. Endesa Termic was built in 1974 and is the second tallest chimney in Europe.

The plant is currently undergoing a process of adaptation to the higher calorific value of hard coal due to the end of lignite extraction in the local mine. Another combined-cycle thermal power plant is currently being tested, which uses gas as fuel and produces 800 MW of power between its three turbines: two gas turbines and one steam turbine. The steam used by the latter is produced using the heat from the exhaust gases of the gas turbines.

== See also ==
- List of towers
- List of chimneys
- List of tallest freestanding structures in the world
- List of tallest structures in Spain
- Endesa acronym in Spanish for Empresa Nacional de Electricidad S.A.
- Ferrol City and Naval Station in North Western Spain
