= Artabri =

Ancient Celtic tribe of Galicia

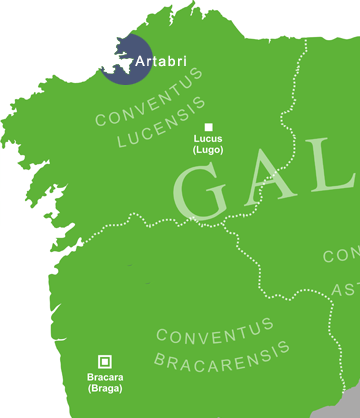
Map of Gallaecia

According to Strabo, the Artabri (or Arrotrebae) were an ancient Gallaeci tribe, Celts living in the extreme north-west of the Iberian Peninsula, now the region of Galicia, Spain, about Cape Nerium (Cabo Prior), outskirts of today's city of Ferrol, where in Roman times, in the 1st century BC, a fishing port existed which also traded in metals (silver, gold, tin and iron ) as well as wild horses and most likely administered from nearby Nerium (Modern day Narahio famous for its medieval castle and cape Nerium modern day Cape Prior) in an area dominated by the Artabri) giving name to the Portus Magnus Artabrorum (Form not just by the bay of Ferrol but the three rias of Ferrol, Betanzos and Corunna). Strabo reports several seaports among the Artabri. Ptolemy places them among Galaeci Lucenses and gives their capital town as Lucus Augusti (now Lugo).

== See also ==
- Pre-Roman peoples of the Iberian Peninsula
