= El Circulo Mercantil de Ferrol =

El Circulo Mercantil de Ferrol (full name: Circulo Mercantil e Industrial de Ferrol, English: The Merchants and Industrialists’ Circle of Ferrol) is an institution created in 1916, six years after the creation of Ferrol's Chamber of Commerce an Industry. Its first president was William V. Martin (a.k.a.: Guillermo V. Martin, by the Spaniards), British Citizen and British Vice-Consul in Ferrol. This institution was originally designed for the flourishing middle classes of the period.

In the 1970s, it developed into a much broader institution in the valley of Serantes on the outskirts of Ferrol. Its facilities include a sports centre with swimming pools, mini-golf range, and tennis courts.

== See also ==
- El Casino de Ferrol
- Club Naval de Ferrol.
