= El Diario de Ferrol =

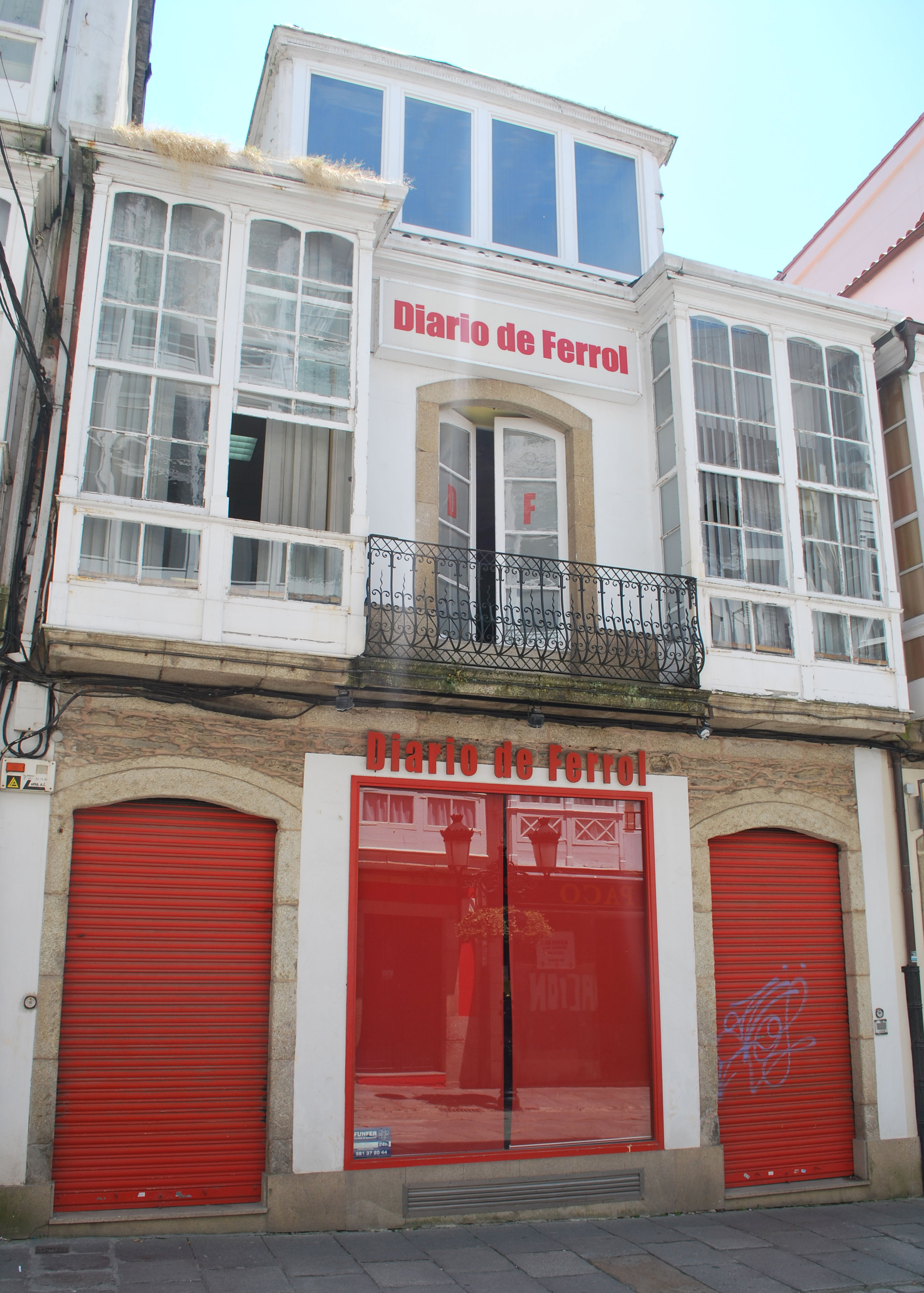
- Type: Daily newspaper
- Format: Compact
- Owner: Editorial La Capital
- Founded: Ferrol, 1998
- Headquarters: Ferrol, Galicia
- Website: www.diariodeferrol.com

Diario de Ferrol is a Galician daily newspaper founded in Ferrol, Spain, in 1998 by Editorial La Capital (company of El Ideal Gallego, DXT Campeón, Diario de Arousa and Diario de Bergantiños). It is the distributed mostly in metropolitan area of Ferrolterra having an important section dedicated to local news. Additionally covers regional and national news thanks to the collaboration it was with the newspaper La Razón. It's the 13th most distributed newspaper in Galicia with an audience in 2017 of 18K readers.

Until the early 1980s, Ferrol had a popular newspaper with a very similar name El Ferrol Diario which became extinct during the critical years of the decade which saw the advent of democracy and the recession in the shipbuilding industry.

The building which hosts the headquarters of Diario de Ferrol also hosts a museum devoted to the history of the newspaper manufacturing in general, though it focuses in Ferrol and its newspapers since the early years of the 19th century.

== See also ==
- El Ferrol Diario
- El Correo Gallego
