= El Ferrol Diario =

Ferrol Diario
- Type: Daily newspaper
- Format: Broadsheet
- Founded: Ferrol, 1950s
- Headquarters: Ferrol, Galicia

Ferrol Diario was a Galician newspaper founded in Ferrol, Spain, sometime in the late 1950s and very early 1960s. It did not survive the turbulent and difficult years of the early 1980s, which were marked with a huge recession in the shipbuilding sector affecting Ferrol considerably.

== See also ==
- El Diario de Ferrol
- El Correo Gallego
