= Ignacio Cabezón =

Spanish politician (1954–2021)

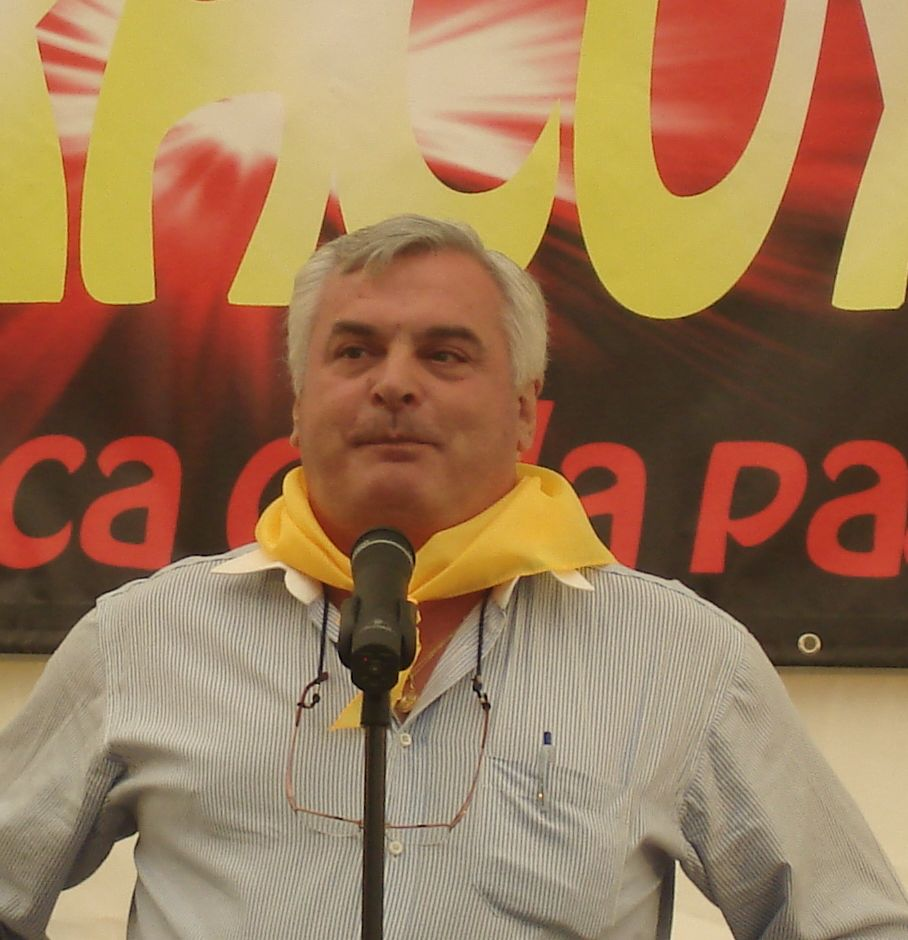
- Cabezón in 2009

Mayor of Neda
- In office 2007–2015
- Preceded by: José Carlos Pita López
- Succeeded by: Ángel Alvariño Saavedra

Personal details
- Born: José Ignacio Cabezón Lorenzo; 1954 Ferrol, Spain
- Died: 8 December 2021 (aged 67)
- Party: TeGa; PPdeG
- Occupation: Doctor

José Ignacio Cabezón Lorenzo (1954 – 8 December 2021) was a Spanish politician and doctor.

== Biography ==
Cabezón ran for mayor of Neda in the 2007 municipal election as a member of Terra Galega. With the support of a coalition with the People's Party, he was elected. In 2011, he ran as a member of the People's Party of Galicia and was re-elected with an absolute majority.

He died on 8 December 2021, at the age of 67.
