= Spain's National Exhibition of Ship Building =

Maritime museum in Ferrol, A Coruña, Spain

Spain's National Exhibition of Ship Building, or Exponav, is a maritime museum in the town of Ferrol of the Province of A Coruña, in the Galicia region of northwest Spain.

== Location ==
The Ferrol Naval Station of the Spanish Navy is the location of the permanent space housing the museum. The exhibition is installed in the historic Edificio de Herrerías (Herrerías Building), a fully restored example of 18th century Spanish Neoclassical architecture.

== Description ==
The museum is dedicated to the maritime history and changing technology of shipbuilding in Spain over the centuries.

This exhibition opened to the public in 2008, and is free of charge. There are special programs to enrich experiences for visiting students from public schools and other educational institutions.

It covers shipbuilding in different periods, including: early beginnings in Medieval Spain; the Spanish Renaissance; Age of Sail ships of the Age of Discovery and Spanish global maritime explorers; merchant and naval ships of the Spanish Empire, including the Spanish Armada; Early Modern Spain and the Industrial Revolution, Spanish–American War, the 20th century, and contemporary present day innovations.

== See also ==
- Maritime museums in Spain
- Ships built in Spain
- Structure of the Spanish Navy in the 21st century
