= School of Naval and Industrial Engineers =

The School of Naval and Industrial Engineers (also Escuela de Peritos Navales de Ferrol and Escuela Universitaria de Ingeniería Técnica Naval de Ferrol) was created in 1963 by a Ministerial Order from Madrid, in accordance with a direct initiative of General Francisco Franco. It was Franco's intention to be present for the official inauguration of the premises in 1966, but in the end this was not possible.

The School kept always its dependency to the Ministry of Education and Science in Madrid, but when in 1990 the University of A Corunna came to exist as a fully independent body fully detached from the University of Santiago de Compostela, it was decided from A Coruña that a full integration with the newly created institution was going to be a good idea. So, as a consequence of that decision, and from that date onwards the School has been part of the University of A Coruña. It is now the Escuela Universitaria Politécnica Ferrol.

== Historical background ==
In 1772, during the reign Charles III of Spain it was created in Ferrol the First Royal Academy of Naval Engineers in Spain. The purpose of this Royal Academy was to train the future members of the 1770 newly created Professional Body.

About a century later, in the nineteenth century a totally modernized "school of Naval Engineers" was put in Ferrol as part of the general renewal of the Spanish Navy after the abandonment of the entire sector after the naval disaster of Trafalgar in 1805 which saw the streets of Ferrol empty of life as empty were its shipyards. But by the mid nineteenth century things were looking very differently as the latest technological achievements of the English Industrial revolution were brought forward to the best shipyard in the country.

So, in 1858 the Royal Dockyards of Ferrol were launching Spain's first steam propelled ship which it was the first iron-hulled too.

== See also ==
- University of A Coruña Established in 1990.
- Ferrol Industrial City and Naval Station in North-Western Spain.
