= Marquis of Amboage =

Spanish philanthropist and politician

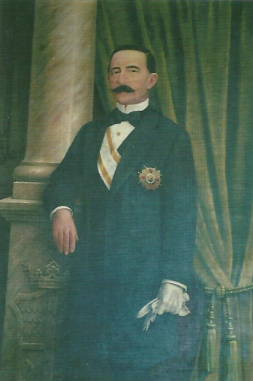
Marquis of Amboage

Pla y Monge, Ramón Pedro Francisco or the Marquis of Amboage (19 October 1823 - 6 September 1892) was a philanthropic multimillionaire and politician of the 19th century born in Ferrol, Galicia.

In 1875, for his work, he received the Grand Cross of the Order of Isabella the Catholic.
