= Frederick H. Shaw =

Frederick Howard Shaw (Federico H. Shaw in Spain) was born in the naval station of Ferrol in northwestern Spain on 20 October 1864. Despite the fact that he was a British subject by birth, most of his life and political career took place in Spain.

His most remarkable political achievements took place during the reign of King Alfonso XIII and Antonio Maura y Montaner's government, when he was given a prominent role in the creation of Spain's social security, the Institute of Provision. In fact, his role was to develop from scratch the entire administrative procedure to be followed by the then newly created institution.

He was also the first administrator of the "Caja General de Pensiones" (General Ministry of Pensions).

He died in Madrid on 11 August 1920.
