= Old Casino de Ferrol =

El Casino de Ferrol is a historical edifice in Ferrol, Spain, created as a social catalyst to satisfy the social needs of the 19th century incipient local bourgeoisie and upper classes.

The city and naval station of Ferrol was going to be the cradle of the Spanish Socialist Workers Movement as well as the Spanish Feminist Movement.

Since the 1980s, El Casino de Ferrol took over in a joined venture another historical institution in the same city: El Cub de Tenis de Ferrol. Together, they formed El Casino Ferrolano Tenis Club and all points up at the beginning of the 21st century to a harmonious long lasting future together.

El Casino de Ferrol, like any other institution in modern Spain, has its membership open to any one to join in.

== See also ==
- Club Naval de Ferrol
- El Circulo Mercantil de Ferrol
