= Spanish Royal Academy of Naval Engineers =

The Spanish Royal Academy of Naval Engineers is a military naval academy in Ferrol, Spain, founded in 1772, during the reign Charles III of Spain. The purpose of this Royal Academy was to train the future members of the 1770 newly created Professional Body.

== See also ==
- School of Naval and Industrial Engineers, Ferrol, 1963
