= El Ideal Gallego =

- Type: Daily newspaper
- Format: Broadsheet
- Owner: El Ideal Gallego
- Founder: José Toubes Pego
- Founded: 1917
- Headquarters: Ferrol, Galicia
- Website: www.elidealgallego.com

El Ideal Gallego is a Galician newspaper from A Coruña, Spain.

== History and profile ==
El Ideal Gallego was first published in A Coruña on 1 April 1917. Its founder was José Toubes Pego. The paper was fined 10,000 pesetas in 1971 for not obeying by the law of press and printing.

In 1999, El Ideal Gallego acquired El Diario de Ferrol becoming its editor and moving their headquarters to the City Port and Naval Station of Ferrol, which like A Coruña, also lies in Galicia.
