= MeteoGalicia =

Spanish meteorological agency

Agency overview
- Formed: 2000
- Type: Meteorological agency
- Jurisdiction: Xunta de Galicia
- Headquarters: Santiago de Compostela, Galicia
- Employees: 35
- Minister responsible: Agustín Hernández Fernández de Rojas, Minister of the Environment, Territory and Infrastructures
- Agency executive: Vicente Pérez Muñuzuri, Director
- Parent agency: Ministry of the Environment, Territory and Infrastructures
- Website: www.meteogalicia.es

MeteoGalicia is the regional meteorological agency for Galicia, Spain. It was founded in 2000 following an agreement between the then Ministry of the Environment - now known as the Ministry of the Environment, Territory and Infrastructures - and the University of Santiago de Compostela.

MeteoGalicia is divided into four departments: Operative weather forecast, Numerical weather forecast, Meteorological visualization and Climatology.
