= Ferrol =

- Municipality
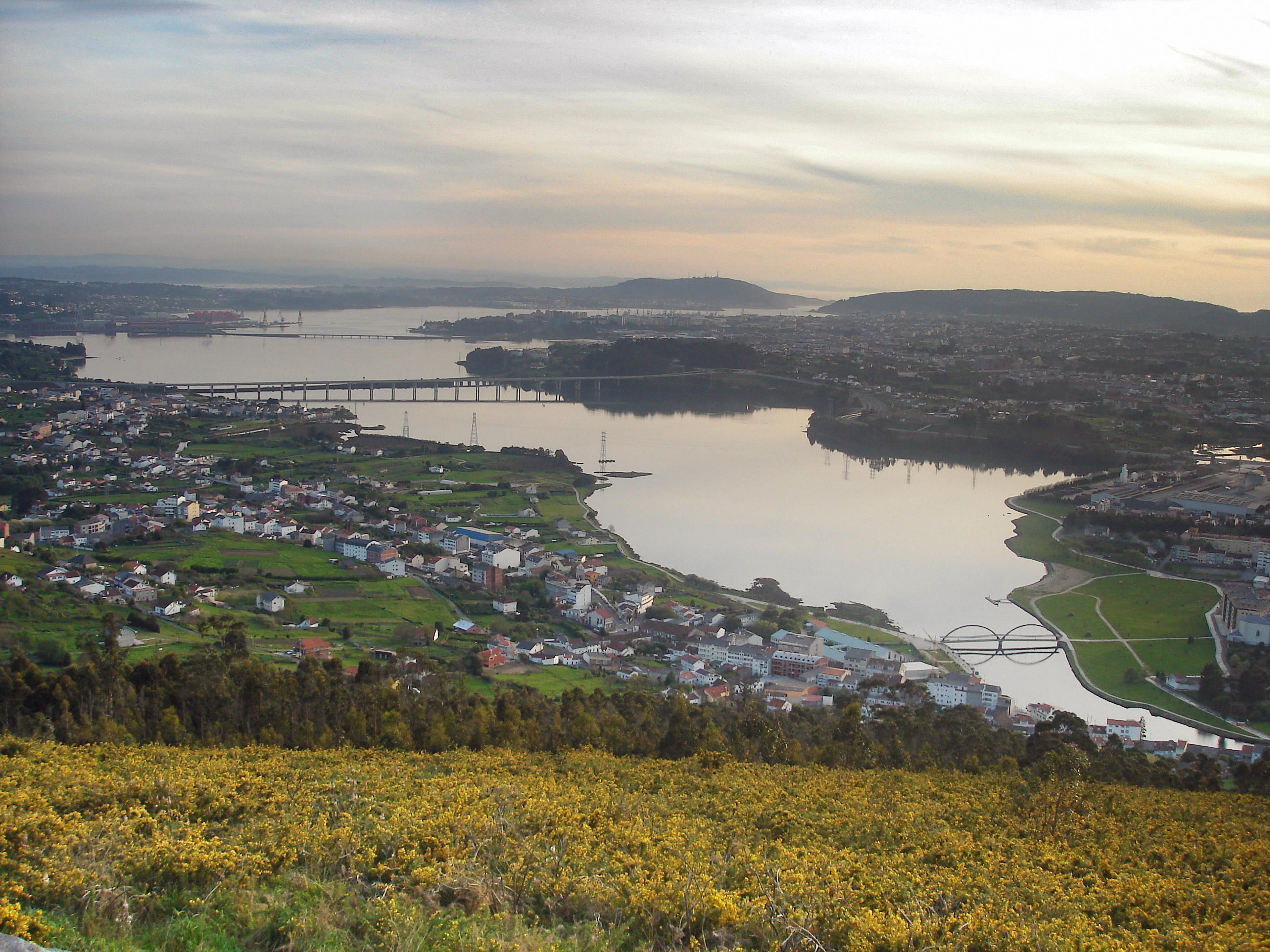
- Ferrol natural harbour, the city is in the background to the right

- Flag Coat of arms
- Interactive map of Ferrol
- Location within Galicia Location within Spain
- Coordinates: 43°29′04″N 08°13′58″W
- Country: Spain
- Autonomous Community: Galicia
- Province: A Coruña
- Comarca: Ferrol
- Fishing Village: 1st century BC
- Christian Outpost: 8th century
- Royal Arsenal: 16th century
- Royal Dockyard: 18th century
- Parishes: Brión, A Cabana, Covas, Doniños, Esmelle, Ferrol, A Graña, Leixa, Mandiá, Marmancón, A Mariña, Trasancos, Serantes

Government
  - Type: Elected city council that chooses a mayor amongst their members.
  - Body: Concello de Ferrol
  - Mayor: José Manuel Rey Varela (PPdeG-PP)

Area
  - Total: 82.65 km^{2} (31.91 sq mi)

Population (2024)
  - Total: 64,358
  - Density: 778.7/km^{2} (2,017/sq mi)
- Demonym(s): ferrolan (m), ferrolana (f)
- Time zone: CET (GMT +1)
  - Summer (DST): CEST (GMT +2)
- Postcode: 15401–15406
- Area code: +34 981
- Website: http://www.ferrol.gal/

Ferrol (Galician: [feˈrɔl], Spanish: [feˈrol]) is a city in the province of A Coruña in the autonomous community of Galicia in Spain, located in the Rías Altas, in the vicinity of Strabo's Cape Nerium (modern-day Cape Prior). With a population of 64,358 as of 2024, Ferrol is the 7th-largest city in Galicia. With Eume to the south and Ortegal to the north, Ferrol forms the comarca of Ferrolterra.

Around a hundred years ago, and earlier, the harbour, with its depth, capacity and overall safety, had few equals in Europe; its entrance was very narrow, commanded by forts, and could even be shut by a boom.

Ferrol has been a major naval shipbuilding centre for most of its history, being the capital of the Spanish Navy's Maritime Department of the North since the time of the early Bourbons. In the 17th century, Ferrol held the largest arsenal in Europe. Today, the city contains several major shipbuilding yards belonging to the state-owned Navantia Group.

Ferrol was the birthplace of the dictator Francisco Franco in 1892. The municipality was officially named after him as "El Ferrol del Caudillo" from September 1938 to December 1982. It was also the birthplace of the founder of the Spanish Socialist Workers' Party (PSOE), Pablo Iglesias, in 1850.

Ferrol is one of the starting points of the English Way of the Camino de Santiago. Due to the modern requirement that pilgrims must travel 100 km (approx. 62 mi) by foot in order to be officially recognised, the city is a preferential starting point for those traversing the English Way.

== Etymology ==
The first historical mention of this settlement, then called Burum or Arotebrarum Portum, appears in the history of Pomponius Mela, a Roman historian who in the year AD 43 detailing a description of the Portus Magnus Artabrorum, the "great port of the Artabri". The current toponym Ferrol, though, can only be traced back to the Middle Ages; a document from 1087 mentions sancto Iuliano de Ferrol, near the monastery of San Martín de Jubia (12th century, in Romanesque style), where Ferrol is probably the local evolution of the genitive form of the Latin name Ferreolus; Ferrol was probably, in origin, the estate of one Ferreolus. In 1982 the government of Spain officially adopted the name Ferrol in accordance with its long history and tradition.

Another theory about the etymology of the name Ferrol posits some relation to the Latin word ferro (iron), as the area has long been rich in metals, especially iron and tin, but also gold and silver. It is possible, since the bay of Ferrol was such a well guarded port, that the old fishing village was named after the metal by traders reaching the enclave.

Alternatively, the name may derive from the legend of a Breton saint, Ferreol, who supposedly arrived there on a ship amid a chorus of seven sirens. Another tradition says that Ferrol comes from farol, alluding to the heraldic figure that appears on the coat of arms of the city. However, according to experts, the coat of arms of Ferrol dates back only to the eighteenth century.

== History ==
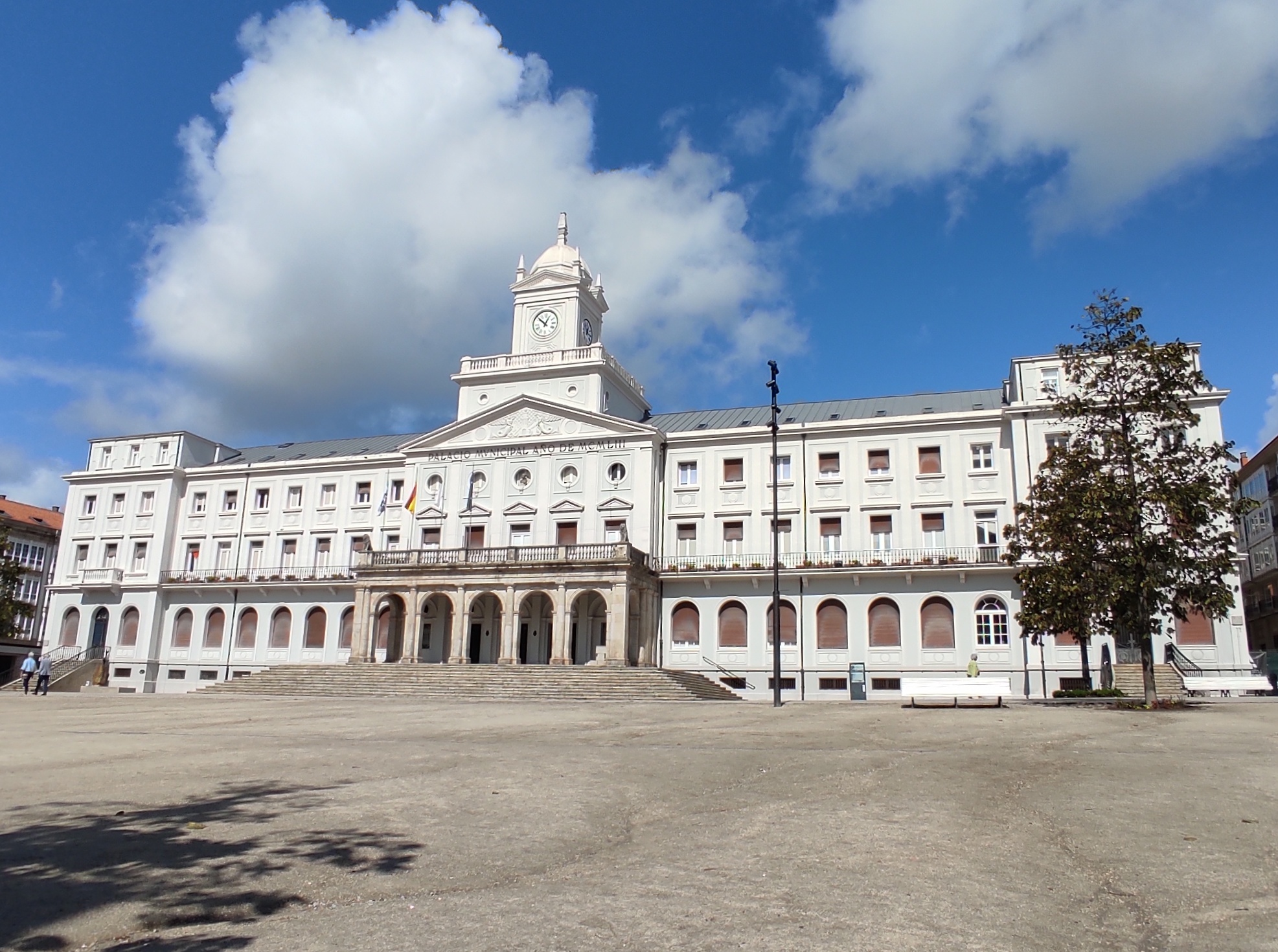
City hall, inaugurated in 1953

The existence of prehistoric human settlements in the area that would later become Ferrol is suggested by the abundance of burial chambers and megalithic monuments, as well as petroglyphs and other archaeological findings. The Phoenicians established in this area several dried and salted cod stations and their presence, together with that of the Ancient Greeks, is well documented by such classical historians as Herodotus, Strabo, Pomponius Mela, and Ptolemy. In Roman times, in the 1st century BC, a fishing port existed which also traded in metals (like silver, gold, tin and iron), and wild horses. Near Ferrol there is a place called Naraío (famous for its medieval castle), whose name bears a phonetic resemblance Strabo's Nerium, modern day Cape Prior. In ancient Hispania, these parts of the Iberia were dominated by the Artabri (or Arrotrebae), who gave their name to the Portus Magnus Artabrorum ("Great Port of the Artabri"), formed not only by the bay of Ferrol but the three rias of Ferrol, Betanzos and A Coruña. Ferrol was then, as it is today, a first class natural harbour in the treacherous waters of the Atlantic, and very well guarded. Historically, it has often been described as the best natural port in Europe.

After the fall of the Western Roman Empire the whole Iberian Peninsula, including Ferrol, was raided by the Vandals and incorporated in 411 to the Suebic Kingdom of Galicia; their kingdom was incorporated in 584 by Leovigild to the Visigothic Kingdom.

Following the collapse of the Suebic-Visigothic state, these Christian parts of Iberia saw very little change in comparison with other parts of the peninsula, becoming part of the Kingdom of Asturias as early as AD 750. Over time, the Kingdom of Asturias would split into further Christian kingdoms, causing the area to change hands several times between Galicia, Leon, and finally Castile.

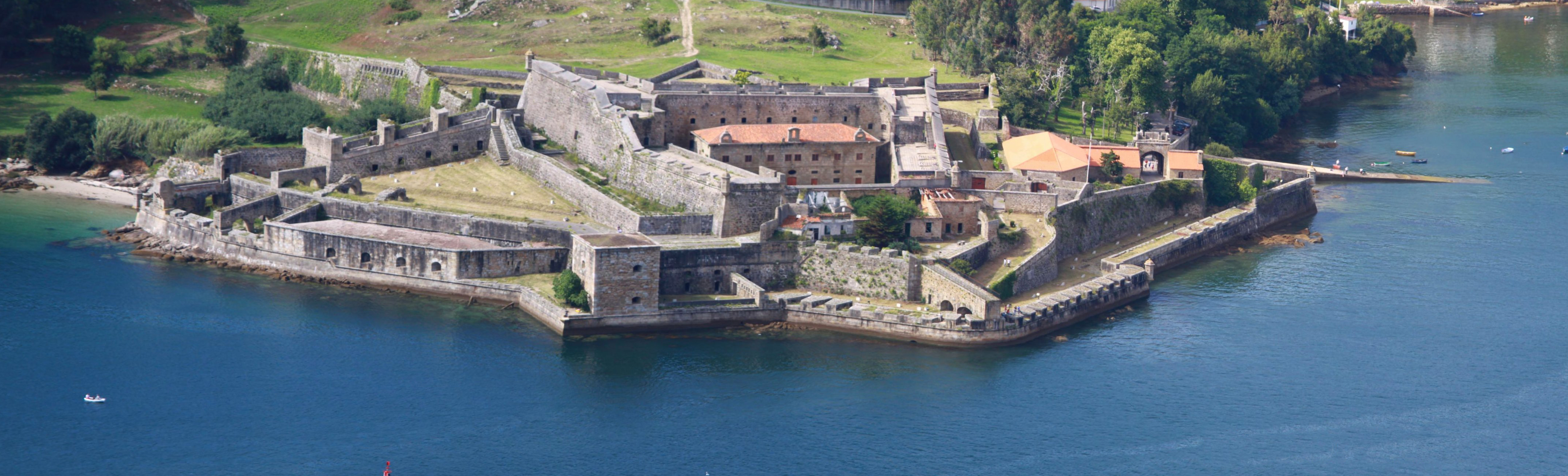
The castle of San Felipe at the entrance of the harbour

During the Second Crusade Ferrol played a significant role when the crusade ships organised by Pope Eugene III en route to the Holy Land, sought refuge in its bay due to the rough waters they encountered after leaving Dartmouth and the English Channel in the Atlantic in May 1147 when the contingent carrying 6,000 English and Scottish crusaders just joined a continental fleet of 5,000 Germans and 2,000 Flemish crusaders numbering all together a total 164 ships that needed a safe haven and some of the ships repairs and resupplying. Once in the safety of the bay of Ferrol they did have time to visit neighbouring Santiago de Compostela on 24 May 1147 to celebrate Pentecost Day in the City of St. James the Great where they visited his Holy Remains. The sea journey to the Holy Land continued but another storm in the Atlantic forced the fleet to dock at Porto where they met King Alfonso I of Portugal who convince them to join forces in order to take the enclave of Lisbon from the Saracens and that's how the best port in the Iberian Peninsula fell to into Christian hands on 25 October 1147 becoming integral part of the Kingdom of Portugal straight away and from 1255 its very own capital.

Ferrol served as a strategic safe port during the Hundred Years' War and sided with the House of Trastamara during the Castilian Civil War. As a personal reward to Fernan Perez de Andrade, in 1371, Henry II gave the town to the powerful Andrade family.

In 1568 a fire reduced the old medieval town to rubble; in the same period some parts of the existing fortifications at the entrance of the estuary were built. The town was considered more important as a royal arsenal at this time than as a harbour.

With the arrival of the Bourbons in the 18th century, Ferrol became a leading naval centre. Ferrol was made capital of the Maritime Department of the North, formed under Ferdinand VI and Charles III for the defence of the Spanish Colonial Empire in America. Rapid improvements followed, notably under the leadership of the Marquis of Ensenada, and the position of Ferrol was made almost unassailable from the sea, the difficulties of disembarking troops on its precipitous coast being strengthened by a renewed line of fortresses and newly built castles, including that of San Carlos.

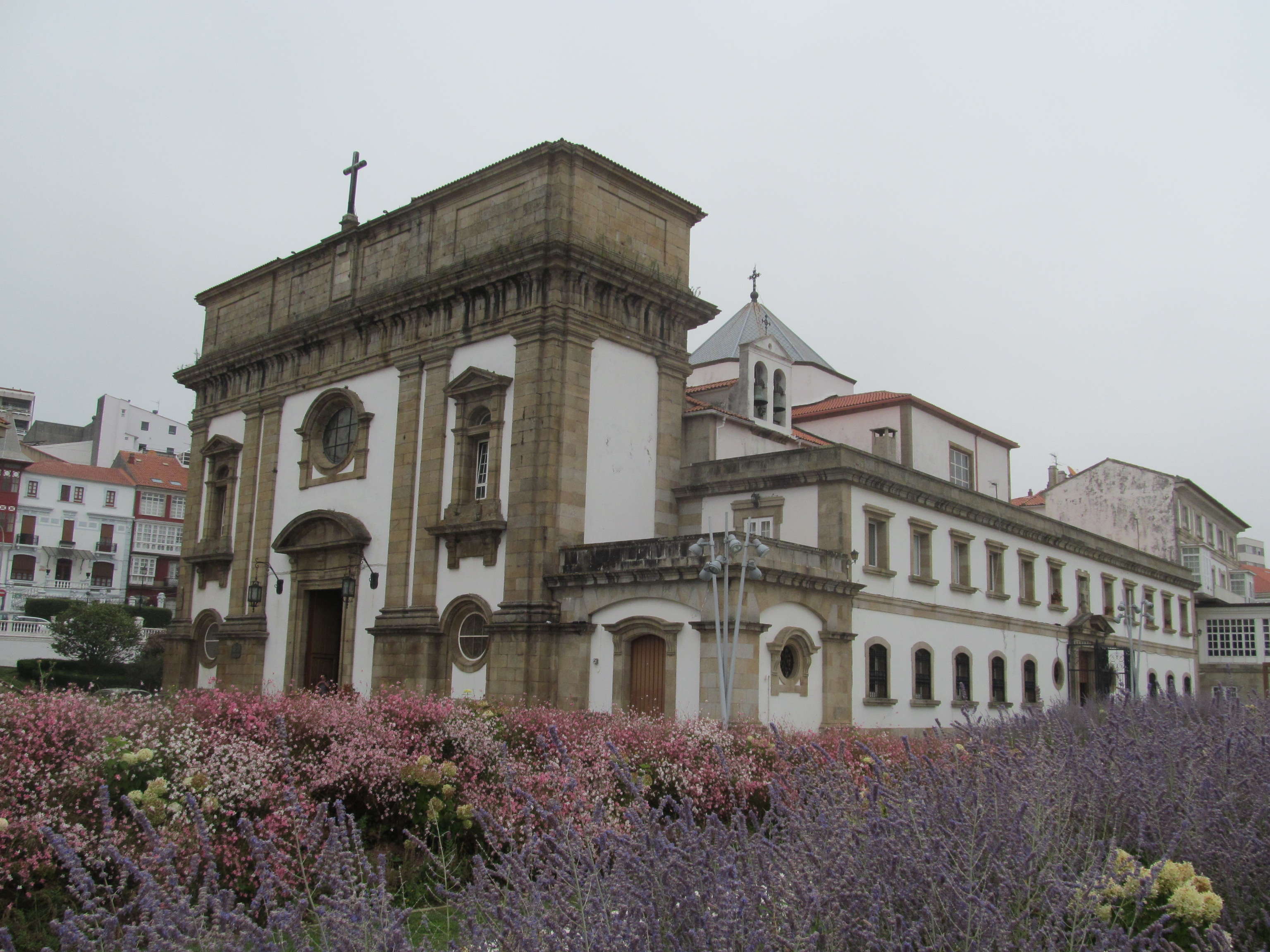
Church of San Francisco, another example of Neoclassical architecture in the city

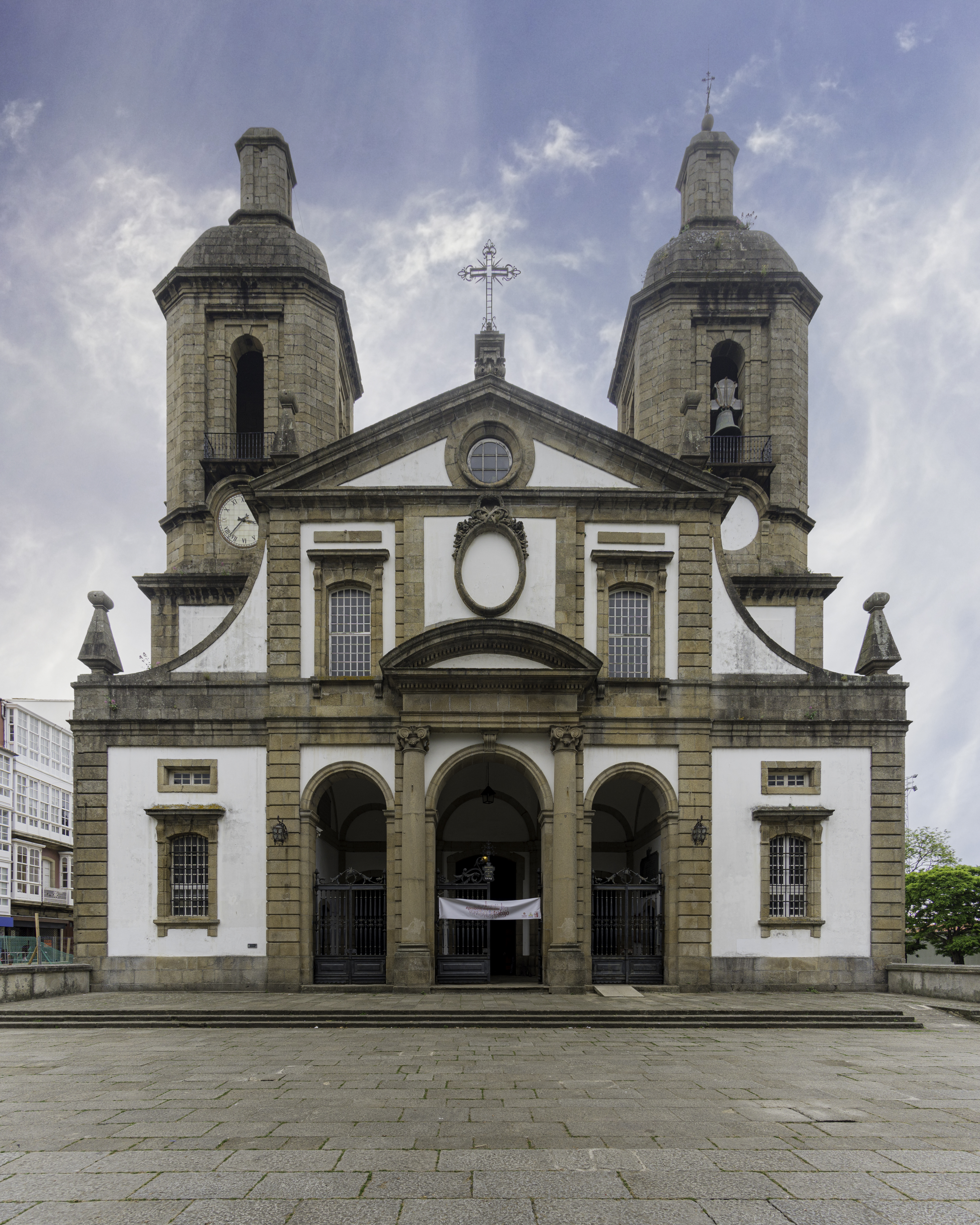
Co-Cathedral of Saint Julian, built in the Neoclassical style

The Royal Dockyards of A Graña and Ferrol, built between 1726 and 1783, produced ships protected with copper sheets from the rolling mills of Xubia. In 1772, The Spanish Royal Academy of Naval Engineers of Ferrol, the first such academy in Spain, was created. For the most laborious work, six hundred galley slaves were employed in the harbour.

Ferrol is famous in the history of the struggle between the Spanish Empire and the British for being one of the only enclaves in the world, together with Cartagena de Indias, that always resisted occupation successfully; Ferrol was virtually impossible to blockade in the Age of Sail, as strong westerly winds would take any blockading force away along the treacherous north coast of Spain towards the Costa da Morte (Coast of Death), where they had no safe haven. The geography of Ferrol meant that an entire Spanish fleet could slip out on a single tide. By the time the British were able to resume the blockade, the Spanish would be safely away and out to sea. Despite these advantages, a decline set in during the reign of Charles IV, and in 1800, during the Ferrol Expedition, after the defences had been reduced, a British fleet of 109 vessels landed troops on the beach of Doniños to take the Castle of San Felipe. Although only equipped with meagre artillery, the castle's small defence force under the command Count Donadio, together with a sizable number of volunteer citizens of Ferrol, successfully resisted the attack and the fleet withdrew. The alliance with the United Kingdom during the Peninsular War of 1808–1814 failed to prevent the deterioration in the town's fortunes. The arsenals and fortresses were abandoned and they were easily occupied by the French in 1809.

When the war with Napoleonic France was over, many of the South American colonies chose to pursue independence from Spain and the shipyards of Ferrol went into a serious decline, losing most of their civilian, clergy and military population. By 1824, Ferrol had a population of just 10,000 civilians and about 6,000 military personnel (stationed locally, if not permanently, at least during most of the year). Its mathematical school for marine artillerists, the pilot school, and the Spanish Royal Academy of Naval Engineers were almost completely empty, in stark contrast to the glorious years of abundance before the Battle of Trafalgar in 1805.

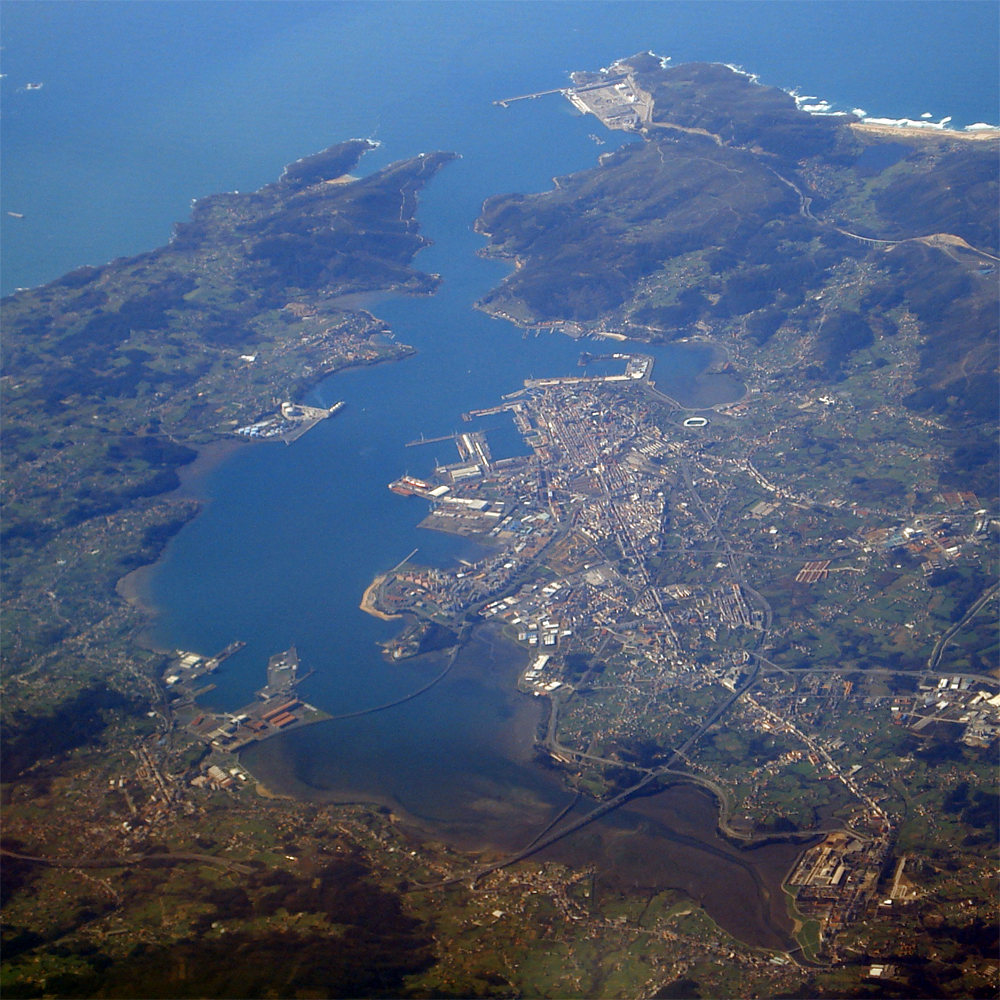
Aerial view of the city and its ria in 2009

Ferrol built only two ships of the line between 1794 and 1845, although nine frigates and a considerable number of smaller warships were also constructed in this period. After half a century of decreased activity, it lost its title of capital under Ferdinand VII. However, there was a massive renovation during the leadership of Cardinal Alberoni and in just a few years fourteen great line-of-battle-ships were launched. New activities sprang up and Ferrol was employing 2,000 workmen in its foundries, now in full operation. A School of Naval Engineers was established where 40 students were taught the scientific principles of their profession by competent instructors educated in England and France. So successful in bringing the world's most advanced technologies was the administration of the Marquis de Molina, the Spanish Minister for Naval affairs, that by 1858 the Royal Dockyards of Ferrol were launching Spain's first steam propelled ship, which was also its first iron-hulled sailing ship.

The second half of the 19th century brought to the Royal Dockyards of Ferrol not only employment, but also concomitant social and political tensions, which culminated in the failed republican uprising of 1872. Steamers between Ferrol and the port of Havana in Spanish Cuba were in frequent operation at the time, such that shipyard workers who got into trouble with the local authorities in Ferrol often fled to the Spanish Main.

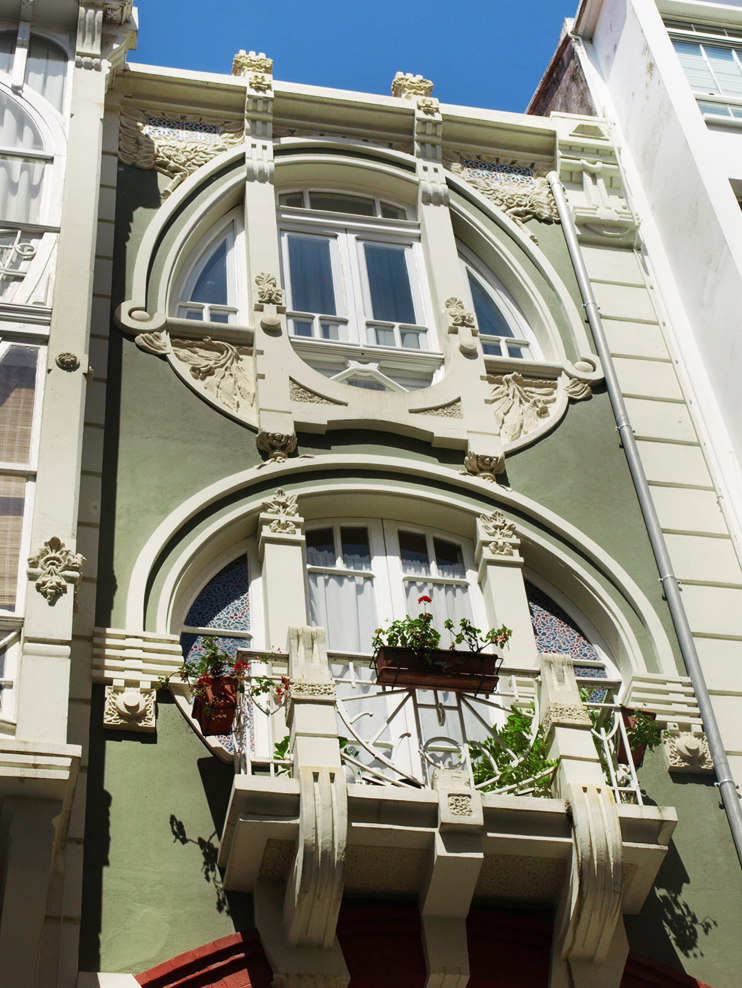
Art Nouveau building in the Magdalena neighbourhood, designed by Rodolfo Ucha

From the days of the Armada to the present, the Bay of Ferrol has attracted numerous ships seeking repairs or refuge after meeting with disaster or rough waters trying to cross the Bay of Biscay in bad weather. Such was the case of Cleopatra, carrying one of the two Cleopatra Needles, which stands today on the Thames Embankment in London, UK. It arrived in Ferrol on 19 October 1877 after almost sinking off the west coast of France five days earlier. A plaque commemorating the event and those who died can be seen at the base of the Needle in London.

Ten years after the Spanish–American War of 1898, in which Spain lost Cuba and the Philippines, the Antonio Maura government, in an attempt to restore the Spanish Navy and Spanish shipbuilding industry, hired the Spanish Society for Naval Construction, whose major investors were a British-Spanish conglomerate taking contracts in the following proportions: 40% Vickers Sons and Maxim, 30% Marquis of Comillas of the Spanish Transatlantic Company, and 30% Biscay Furnace Company. All the previously state-owned shipbuilding yards, workshops, foundries and dry docks at Ferrol were handed over to the technical expertise of some of the finest British shipbuilders; John Brown, Vickers and Armstrong were now in charge of building the new Spanish fleet.

For a period of sixteen years, the technicians were exclusively British, and the situation was not altered till 1925, when management was taken over by Spanish engineers. This was one of the new policies introduced by the newly installed government of the dictator Miguel Primo de Rivera (1923–1930). The arrival of the British coincided with the construction of a local tram system (1924–1961).

In view of the outbreak of the Spanish Civil War, and due to the fear of social unrest in the naval station, the Foreign Office in London organized a ship to repatriate all the remaining British citizens. On 22 July 1936, HMS Witch left Ferrol bound for Britain. At the beginning of the war, the shipbuilding yards, workshops, foundries and dry docks in Ferrol were taken over by the state. They were fully nationalized in 1945 under the name "Bazán", later renamed "IZAR", and, from January 2005, Navantia. The town was the birthplace of Francisco Franco, after whom the city was officially known as El Ferrol del Caudillo from 1938 to 1982. The end of the Spanish State and the arrival of democracy in 1978 did little to arrest Ferrol's economic decline, and from 1982 to the early 1990s, the city faced numerous problems due to the waning of the naval sector. The beginning of the new millennium, however, has been a time of economic expansion and prosperity in general. A new motorway and an outer-port have been built, as have numerous arcades and shopping centres, mostly in the outskirts of the city between Ferrol and Naron. Young shoppers and their families frequent the stores and enjoy weekend days out with amenities like bowling, cafeterias, fast food outlets, cinemas and sports facilities.

The Spanish Navy Spanish Squadron still takes part in naval demonstrations and in June 2008 Ferrol hosted the large NATO Maritime Exercise Loyal Mariner (RN).

The Ferrol Terminus railway station, connecting Lugo to Ferrol, branching off from the line from Madrid to nearby A Coruña, was sanctioned by the Cortes in Madrid as early as 1865 but was not finally inaugurated until 1904. A century later, the High Speed AVE Railway suffered similar delays, eventually opening in 2013.

In September 2017, a new local railway branch serving the outer port of Ferrol (known as the Canelinas-Ferrol container port), the inside of the bay docks and the Ferrol Terminus railway station was given the green light to begin construction, and aims to move large numbers modern containers in and out of Ferrol, distributing goods throughout Galicia and the rest of Spain and Europe. A small railway local branch operated here in the early years of the 20th century. At that time, Ferrol itself and its ports were intended solely for the Royal Navy and its shipyards, and hence were not open to the general commerce per se. Historically, however, there have been many exceptions, with local businesses including PEMSA (timber), PYSBE (dried and salted cod) and HISPANIA (pencils), in addition to manufacturers of hats, paper and leather, plus naval and hardware stores. Items such as corn, wine, brandy, vinegar, pilchards and herrings (and other produce from Ferrol's own fisheries) have also been exported.

== Climate ==
Like much of Galicia, Ferrol has a humid oceanic climate, characterised by year-long mild temperatures, rainy winters, and relatively dry summers, although it is slightly wetter than the typical Spanish Mediterranean climate during the summer season.

Climate data for Ferrol, Galicia (Spain) (2002–2010)
Month	Jan	Feb	Mar	Apr	May	Jun	Jul	Aug	Sep	Oct	Nov	Dec	Year
Mean daily maximum °C (°F)	13.3 (55.9)	14.1 (57.4)	15.8 (60.4)	17.2 (63.0)	18.9 (66.0)	22.1 (71.8)	23.2 (73.8)	23.9 (75.0)	23.4 (74.1)	19.8 (67.6)	15.8 (60.4)	13.9 (57.0)	18.4 (65.1)
Daily mean °C (°F)	10.2 (50.4)	10.2 (50.4)	11.8 (53.2)	12.9 (55.2)	14.8 (58.6)	17.9 (64.2)	19.0 (66.2)	19.7 (67.5)	18.4 (65.1)	15.7 (60.3)	12.5 (54.5)	10.3 (50.5)	14.5 (58.1)
Mean daily minimum °C (°F)	7.3 (45.1)	7.0 (44.6)	8.4 (47.1)	9.4 (48.9)	11.2 (52.2)	14.3 (57.7)	15.5 (59.9)	16.4 (61.5)	14.8 (58.6)	12.4 (54.3)	9.6 (49.3)	7.3 (45.1)	11.1 (52.0)
Average rainfall mm (inches)	140 (5.5)	97 (3.8)	102 (4.0)	97 (3.8)	75 (3.0)	57 (2.2)	51 (2.0)	38 (1.5)	50 (2.0)	183 (7.2)	208 (8.2)	157 (6.2)	1,257 (49.5)
Average precipitation days (≥ 1 mm)	17	11	13	11	11	7	7	6	6	14	17	15	137
Mean monthly sunshine hours	79	124	158	194	218	238	261	248	217	139	95	90	2,060
Source: MeteoGalicia

== Demographics ==
Historical population
Year	Pop.	±%
1842	22,006	—
1857	25,317	+15.0%
1877	29,943	+18.3%
1887	33,497	+11.9%
1900	33,874	+1.1%
1910	34,309	+1.3%
1920	41,435	+20.8%
1930	49,474	+19.4%
1940	54,199	+9.6%
1950	67,881	+25.2%
1960	70,254	+3.5%
1970	80,194	+14.1%
1981	87,691	+9.3%
1991	83,045	−5.3%
2001	77,950	−6.1%
2011	71,690	−8.0%
2021	64,928	−9.4%
Source: INE

As of 2024, the foreign-born population is 6,135, equal to 9.5% of the total population. The 5 largest foreign nationalities are Colombians (1,057), Venezuelans (655), Cubans (584), Moroccans (480) and Brazilians (424).

Foreign population by country of birth (2024)
Country	Population
Colombia	1,057
Venezuela	655
Cuba	584
Morocco	480
Brazil	424
Peru	384
Argentina	220
Dominican Republic	189
Uruguay	156
Portugal	152
Ecuador	134
Romania	116
United Kingdom	114
France	112
Switzerland	110

== Economy ==
1. Primary Industries – Agriculture (Horse Breeding), Aquaculture (Fish Farming), Fishing (Specializing in the Atlantic Shoals), Important Mines (ENDESA), NTFPs (Forestry), Quarries and Timber.
2. Secondary Industries – Shipbuilding, Ship Engines, Turbines (Wind Mills and Ships), Electrical Equipment, Ironworks, Fashion (Textiles), Food (Canned Fish) and Wood-Made Products.
3. Tertiary Industries – Mercantile, Fishing and Military Ports, Restaurants, News Media (Ferrol TV/Diario de Ferrol), Hotels (Barceló Almirante/Pazo Libunca), Leisure and Tourism (World Surf Competitions, Popular Transatlantic Steamships Stop), Consulting, Health Care/Hospitals (Arquitecto Marcide Hospital Complex), Education (Schools, Colleges/ESENGRA and Universities/UNED/PERITOS) and Public Utilities, Franchises (main brand names and designer label's shops), Wholesale (Navy Suppliers/Anton-Martin) and Retail Industries (El Corte Inglés/Alcampo).
4. Quaternary Sector Industries – Naval, Electrical and Mechanical Equipment together with New Technologies.

== Sport ==
The professional football team is Racing de Ferrol which play at the Estadio Municipal de A Malata. Their biggest success is reaching the finals of the 1939 Copa del Generalísimo.

Futsal club O Parrulo FS also play professionally.

CB OAR Ferrol was the professional basketball team, as was Ferrol CB.

The city's other football club, Club Arsenal de El Ferrol folded in 1993.

== Festivals ==
Event Name	Translation into (in Spanish)	Event Date
The Three Kings Parade	Desfile de los Reges Magos	6 January
Saint Julian's Day	Día de San Julián	7 January
Carnival Festival	Festival de Carnaval	February or March
Saint Josephine's Night	Noche de las Pepitas	18 March
Holy Week Celebration	Semana Santa	March or April
Chamorro's Day	Día de Chamorro	March or April
Horse Riding Competitions	Competiciones de Hípica	April
Galician Literature Day	Día de las Letras Gallegas	17 May
Corpus Christi Celebrations	Corpus Christi	May or June
St. John's Eve	Víspera de San Juan	23 June
Our Lady of Mount Carmel's Day	Día del Carmen	16 July
Celtic Music Festival	Festival de Música Celta	29 July
Traditional Horse Events	Festivales Equinos Tradicionales	August
Surf Championships	Competiciones de Surf	August
Ferrol Summer Festival	Fiestas de Verano de Ferrol	August
Battle of Mount Brion	Batalla del Monte de Brión	25-26 August
Saint Raymond's Day	Día de San Ramón	31 August

== International relations ==
=== Twin towns – Sister cities ===
Ferrol is twinned with:

- Águeda, Portugal (1999)
- Mondoñedo, Galicia, Spain (2004)
- Lugo, Galicia, Spain (2000)
- Vila do Conde, Portugal (1973)

== Notable people ==
- Marquis of Amboage (1823–1892), multimillionaire and politician
- Ángeles Alvariño González (1916–2005), biologist and oceanographer
- Concepción Arenal (1820–1893), writer, feminist activist
- Ignacio Cabezón (1954–2021), politician
- José Canalejas Méndez (1854–1912), former Spanish Prime Minister died in office
- Álvaro Carreras (born 2003), professional footballer
- Ricardo Carvalho Calero (1910–1990), academic at the University of Santiago de Compostela and the first ever professor of Galician language and Galician literature
- Carolina Casanova de Cepeda (1847–1910), soprano
- Mercedes Castro (born 1972), writer
- Ignacio Fernández Toxo (born 1952), ex general secretary of the national union CCOO and President of the ETUC
- Francisco Franco (1892–1975), dictator of Spain from the Spanish Civil War (1936–1939) to his death
- Ramón Franco (1896–1938), aviator and brother of Francisco Franco
- Pablo Iglesias Posse (1850–1925), politician and founder of Spanish socialist party PSOE
- Carlos Jean (born 1973), electronic musician and music producer
- Juan Lembeye (1816–1889), naturalist
- Jesús Vázquez Martínez (born 1965), TV presenter
- Patricio Montojo y Pasarón (1839–1917), Spanish admiral during the Spanish–American War who was defeated at the Battle of Manila Bay
- Nacho Novo (born 1979), professional footballer
- Paloma Pérez-Lago González (born 1967), fashion model and TV presenter
- Jenaro Pérez Villaamil (1807–1854), painter
- Alonso Pita da Veiga (about 1485–1554)
- María Isabel Rivera Torres (born 1952), actress
- Aurora Rodríguez Carballeira (1879–1955), woman who murdered her teenage daughter, conceived as a eugenics experiment
- Frederick H. Shaw (1864–1924)
- Fernando Álvarez de Sotomayor y Zaragoza (1875–1960), painter
- Andrés Suárez, singer-songwriter
- Gonzalo Torrente Ballester (1910–1999), writer
- Paula Vázquez Picallo (born 1973), TV presenter and model
- Benito Vicetto Pérez (1824–1878), writer

== See also ==
- El Casino de Ferrol
- El Circulo Mercantil de Ferrol
- El Correo Gallego
- El Diario de Ferrol
- El Ferrol Diario
- Endesa Termic
- Racing Club de Ferrol
- School of Peritos Navales and Industriales
- Sociedad Española de Construcción Naval
- Spain's National Exhibition of Ship Building
- List of municipalities in A Coruña
