= Curtis, Spain =

Coordinates: 43°8′20″N 8°2′9″W

Curtis
- Municipality
- Flag Coat of arms

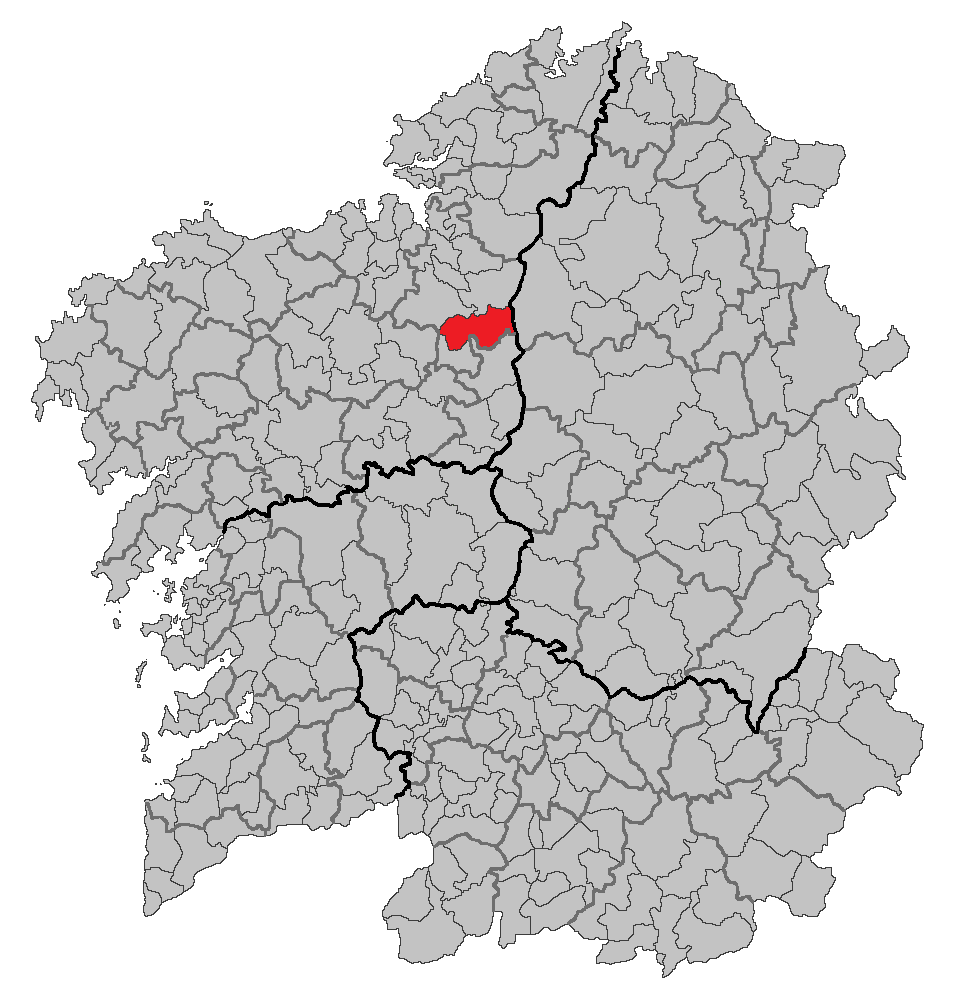
- Location of the municipality of Curtis within Galicia.
- Country: Spain
- Region: Galicia
- Province: A Coruña
- County: Betanzos
- Parishes: Santaia, Fisteus, Foxado, Curtis-Estación

Government
  - Type: Mayor–council
  - Body: Concello de Curtis
  - Mayor: Javier Francisco Caínzos Vázquez (People's Party of Galicia)

Area
  - Land: 117.5 km^{2} (45.4 sq mi)

Population (2025-01-01)
  - Total: 4,242
  - Density: 36.10/km^{2} (93.50/sq mi)
- Demonym: Curtense
- Postal codes: 15310, 15379
- Website: http://www.concellodecurtis.org/

Curtis is a municipality of northwestern Spain in the province of A Coruña, in the autonomous community of Galicia. Its capital is Teixeiro, where its town hall is located. It belongs to the comarca of Betanzos. Curtis has a population of 4,244 inhabitants (INE, 2008). Footballer Lucas Vázquez was born in Curtis in 1991.

== See also ==
List of municipalities in A Coruña
