= El Correo Gallego =

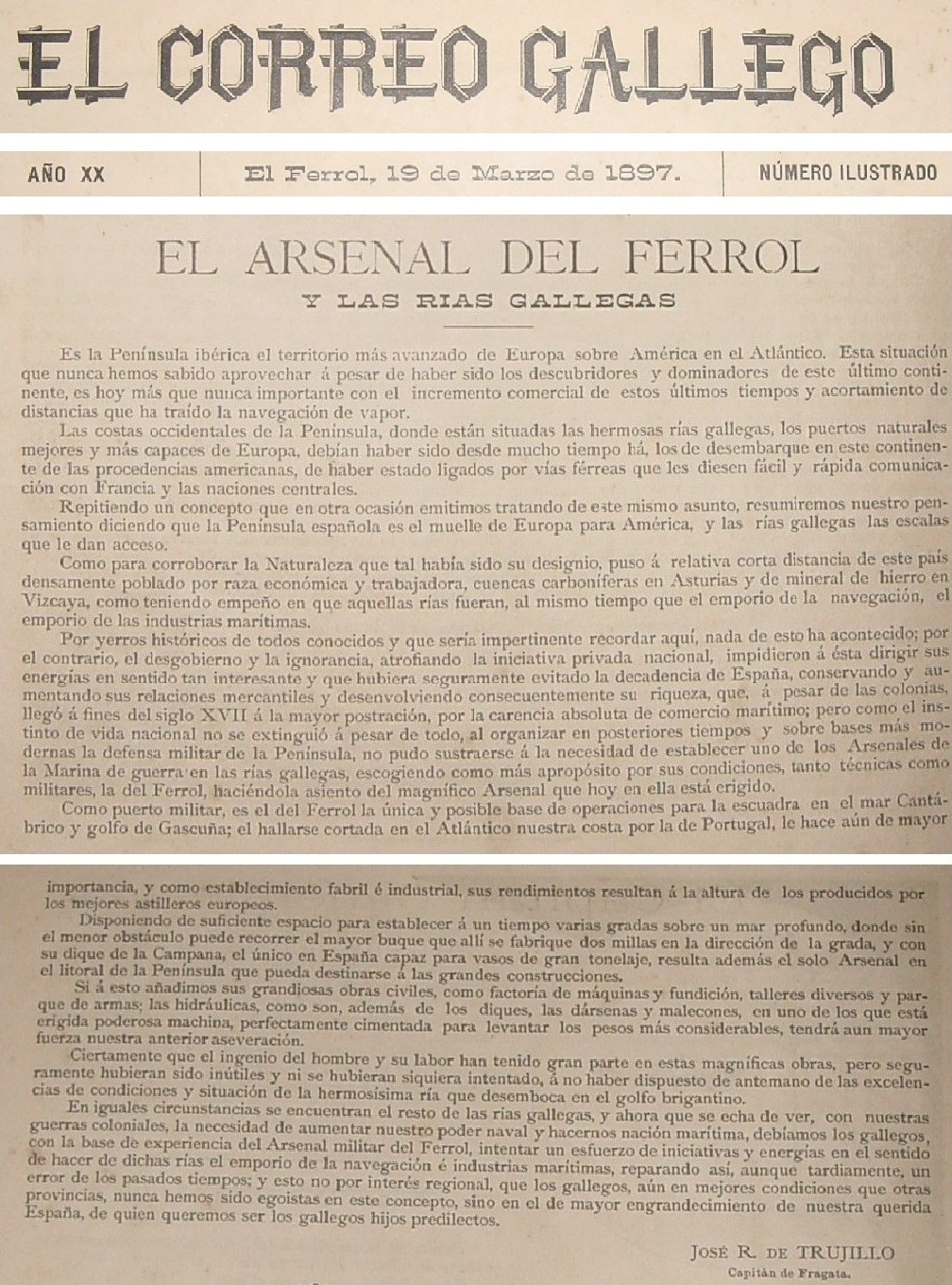
- Type: Daily newspaper
- Format: Compact
- Owner: Grupo Correo Gallego
- Founder: Manuel Comellas Coimbra/José María Abizanda
- Publisher: Editorial Compostela S.A.
- Founded: 1878
- Headquarters: Santiago de Compostela, Galicia
- Website: El Correo Gallego

El Correo Gallego is a Galician newspaper founded in Ferrol, Spain, by José María Abizanda in 1878. In 1938 its owner, Juan Sáenz-Díez García, moved the daily to Santiago de Compostela; since then the paper has been headquartered there. The publisher of the daily is Editorial Compostela S.A.

== In Galician ==
It had versions in Galician called O Correo Galego and Galicia Hoxe, between 1994 and 2011.

Website logo in 1999.

== See also ==
- El Ferrol Diario
