= Timeline of A Coruña =

The following is a timeline of the history of the city of A Coruña, Galicia, Spain.

== Prior to 19th century ==
- 4000–2000 BC – Burial constructions in Monte das Arcas
- 3rd century BC – Castro de Elviña begins occupation.
- 62 BC – Julius Caesar came to the city (then named Brigantium) in pursuit of the metal trade, establishing commerce with what are now France, England and Portugal.
- 2nd century CE – Tower of Hercules built (approximate date).
- 9th century – Björn Ironside visited Tower of Hercules looking for gold
- 911 – Bermudo II started the construction of military positions in the coast, with a defensive role. A fortress with a permanent garrison was built at Faro, in the ruins of the Tower of Hercules.
- 12th century – Igrexa de Santiago (A Coruña) (church) built.
- 13th century – Royal Mint of A Coruña established.
- 1208
  - Afonso IX founded again Crunia. With the privilege of disembarking and selling salt without paying taxes
  - Construction of Walls of A Coruña begins.
- 1302 – Colexiata de Santa María do Campo (church) built.
- 1370 – A Coruña was attacked by Portuguese
- 1386 – A Coruña was attacked by Portuguese again
- 1397 – Walls of A Coruña were rebuilt after portuguese attacks
- 15th century – City renamed "A Coruña".
- 16th century – Palacio de Capitanía de A Coruña is built
- 1501 – Catherine of Aragon departs from Port of A Coruña to marry Arthur, Prince of Wales and become Queen of England.
- 1563 – A Coruña becomes capital of Galicia, when Philip II granted the city the headquarters of the captaincy and the audience
- 1588 – Spanish Armada sails from A Coruña with the purpose of invading England.
- 1589 – The Siege of Coruña by the English Armada. Maria Pita lead defense of the city.
- 1595 – Castelo de Santo Antón (fort) finished (began in 1587).
- 1598 – Coruna sacked by English forces.
- 1693 – Igrexa de San Xurxo (A Coruña) (church) built (approximate date).
- 1722 – A Coruña Aqueduct is built
- 1748 – Palacio de Capitanía de A Coruña is rebuilt
- 1764 – Royal Maritime Posts of America created, growing in the port and commercial field.
- 1765 – Academia de Agricultura del reino de Galicia (learned society) established.
- 1775 – Royal Audience of Galicia builds the Archive of the Kingdom of Galicia
- 1785 – Consulado (merchant guild) established.
- 1790 – Consulado creates first public library in the city following principles of enlightenment.

== 19th century ==
- 1804 – Fábrica Nacional de Cigarros (National Cigar Factory) created.
- 1805 – First stable printing press stablished
- 1809 – 16 January: Battle of Corunna.
- 1820 – A Coruña "joined the revolutionary movement."
- 1823 – City taken by French forces.
- 1835 – Deputación da Coruña (provincial governing body) established.
- 1836 – A Coruña "captured by the Carlists."
- 1841 – Teatro Nuevo (theatre) built on the Rúa Real (A Coruña).
- 1842 – Population: 19,415.
- 1854 – Gas lighting network is created.
- 1858 – First telegraph line between Rioseco (León) and A Coruña
- 1862 – Palacio Provincial rebuilt.^{(gl)}
- 1869 – City walls partially dismantled to join neighbourhoods.
- 1880s – Electric lighting network is created.
- 1882 – La Voz de Galicia newspaper begins publication.
- 1875 – First train begins circulation. A Coruña-Lugo line.
- 1885 – A Coruña-Madrid train begins circulation.
- 1886 – Chamber of Commerce established.
- 1900 – Population: 43,971.

== 20th century ==
- 1901 – Marcela and Elisa marry in Igrexa de San Xurxo becoming first same-sex marriage in Spain.
- 1902 – A Coruña Aqueduct stops being used
- 1903 – First tram begins circulation between Puerta Real and railway station.
- 1906 – Deportivo de La Coruña (football club) formed.
- 1912
  - Santa María de Oza becomes part of city.
  - Palacio municipal de La Coruña (city hall) built.
- 1916
  - Irmandades da Fala (political group) organized.
  - Emilia Pardo Bazán monument erected in the Méndez Núñez Garden.
- 1917 – El Ideal Gallego newspaper begins publication.
- 1925 – Banco Pastor Building built becoming first skyscraper and tallest building in Spain
- 1935 – A Coruña-San Cristovo railway station built.
- 1940 – Population: 104,220.
- 1943 – A Coruña-Santiago rail line inaugurated.
- 1944 – Estadio Riazor (stadium) opens.
- 1948 – First trolleybus begins circulation between Plaza de Pontevedra and Monelos.
- 1960 – Population: 177,502.
- 1962 – Last tram circulates, replaced by trolleybus
- 1963 – A Coruña Airport is inaugurated and the first commercial flight lands (May 23)
- 1964 – A Coruña Termino train station burned in a fire.
- 1965 – First urban bus line.
- 1967 – Dique de Abrigo (Shelter Dam) is inaugurated
- 1968 – Museo Arqueolóxico e Histórico Castelo de Santo Antón (museum) established.
- 1970 – Pazo dos Deportes de Riazor (arena) opens.
- 1973 – Hercón Tower built becoming tallest building in Galicia (119 meters).
- 1975 – First Zara store opens its doors.
- 1979 – Last trolleybus operates in the city
- 1981 – Population: 232,356.
- 1989 – University of A Coruña established.
- 1991 – Coliseum da Coruña and Centro Galego de Artes da Imaxe (film archive) open.
- 1992
  - Orquesta Sinfónica de Galicia (orchestra) formed.
  - Aegean Sea tanker oil spill
  - A Coruña Sea Promenade inaugurated.
- 1994 – Ronda de Outeiro (Second Ring Road) finished.
- 1995 – Domus (museum) opens.
- 1998 – Festival Mozart begins.
- 1999 – Aquarium Finisterrae opens.
- 2000
  - La Opinión A Coruña newspaper begins publication.
  - SuperDepor wins La Liga.

== 21st century ==
- 2001 – R (cable operator) begins operations and spreads fiber optic network across the city.
- 2002 – Estación de Elviña-Universidad (railway station) opens in San Vicente de Elviña.
- 2007 – Elevador del Monte de San Pedro begins operating.
- 2009 – Bicicoruña public bicycle sharing system created.
- 2011 – Population: 245,053.
- 2012 – National Museum of Science and Technology (MUNCYT) opens.
- 2015
  - Xulio Ferreiro becomes mayor.
  - Third Ring Road opens.
- 2019 – Bike lanes reach 35 km

== See also ==
- History of A Coruña
- List of mayors of A Coruña
- Timeline of Galician history

== Bibliography ==
=== in English ===
- Josiah Conder (1830), "Corunna", The Modern Traveller, London: J.Duncan
- Richard Ford (1890), "Corunna", Handbook for Travellers in Spain, vol. 1 (7th ed.), London: J. Murray, p. 208
- "Corunna (city)" . Encyclopædia Britannica. Vol. 7 (11th ed.). 1910. pp. 208–209.
- "Corunna", Spain and Portugal (4th ed.), Leipzig: Karl Baedeker, 1913, hdl:2027/uc2.ark:/13960/t5q81nw29 – via HathiTrust
- Patrick O'Flanagan (2008). "Corunna". Port Cities of Atlantic Iberia, c.1500-1900. Ashgate. ISBN 978-0-7546-6109-2.

=== in Spanish ===
- Enrique de Vedia y Goossens (1845). Historia y descripción de la ciudad de La Coruña (in Spanish). La Coruña: Imp. Domingo Puga.
- Pascual Madoz, ed. (1847). "Coruña". Diccionario geográfico-estadístico-histórico de España y sus posesiones de Ultramar (in Spanish). Vol. 7. Madrid. pp. 42–126. hdl:2027/uc1.32106019734455.
- J. R. Barreiro Fernández (1986). Historia de la ciudad de La Coruña (in Spanish). La Coruña.
