= Elisa and Marcela =

Elisa and Marcela may refer to:

- Elisa and Marcela, who got married in what was the first same-sex marriage in Spain.
- Elisa & Marcela, a 2019 Spanish film by Isabel Coixet on this topic.
