= History of A Coruña =

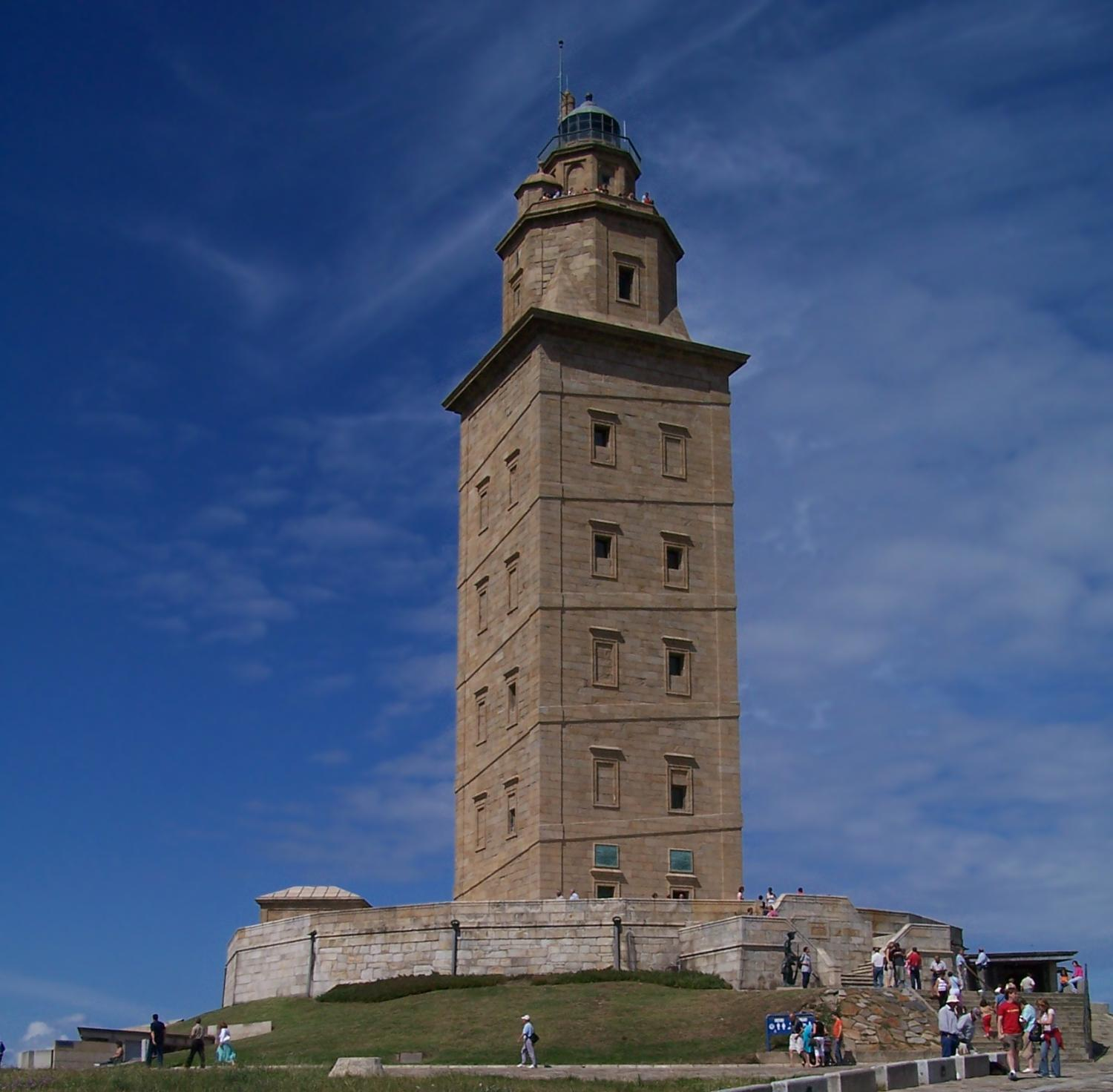
Roman tower of Hercules

A Coruña or Corunna, Galicia (Spain) is located on a promontory in the entrance of an estuary in a big gulf, the Portus Magnus Artabrorum, name of the area used by classical geographers.

== Prehistory ==
A Coruña (La Coruña, Corunna or The Groyne) expanded due to construction between the island where Tower of Hercules is located and the mainland. The oldest part, known popularly as Cidade Vella or Ciudad Vieja (Old City), Cidade Alta or Ciudad Alta (High City) or the Cidade or Ciudad (City), is built on the site of an ancient Celtic hillfort (castro), which was inhabited from the 3rd century BC to the 2nd century AD. Its inhabitants were called the Artabrians, and gave their name to the city in ancient times.

== Roman times ==
The Romans reached the area in the 2nd and 1st centuries BC; Julius Caesar stayed in the city in the year 62 BC. The town started growing, mainly during the 1st and 2nd centuries (when the Tower of Hercules) was built; population growth dropped after the 4th century, in particular due to the incursions of the Normans, which forced the population to flee toward the interior of the Estuary of O Burgo.

== Middle Ages ==
After the fall of the Roman Empire, A Coruña still possessed a commercial port connected with foreign countries, but contacts with the Mediterranean were slowly replaced by the European Atlantic front. But the process of deurbanization that followed the fall of the Romans also affected the city. Between the 7th and 8th centuries the city remained a small town of labourers and sailors who worked mainly on the beach.

The Iriensian Chronicle, written in the 11th century, names Faro do Burgo, one of A Coruña's historical names, as one of the dioceses that King Miro granted to the episcopate of Iria Flavia in the year 572:

"Mirus Rex Sedi suae Hiriensi contulit Dioceses, scilicet Morratium, Salinensem, (...) Bregantinos, Farum..."

[King Miro granted to his iriensi headquarters the dioceses of Morrazo, Salnés (...). Bergantiños, Faro...]

The Arabian invasion of the peninsula didn't affect the archaeological remains of the city, and there is no conclusive evidence that they actually reached the city itself. The main problem that the inhabitants of the city faced in the Middle Ages were Norman raids. During the 9th century the Vikings attacked the city several times, called in that time Faro or Faro Bregancio.

In the year 991, king Bermudo II started the construction of military positions in the coast, with a defensive role. A fortress with a permanent garrison was built at Faro, in the ruins of the Tower of Hercules. To pay for it, gives the power over the city to the bishop of Santiago. He will be the main figure of Galicia until the 15th century.

In 1208, Afonso IX founded again Crunia. With the privilege of disembarking and selling salt without paying taxes, the city enjoyed a big fishing and merchant development. The city grew and it extended towards the peninsula. In 1446 Xoán II granted to A Coruña the title of "City". The Catholic Monarchs established in this city the Royal Audience of the Kingdom of Galicia, leaving Compostela. A Coruña also received the headquarters of the General Captain.

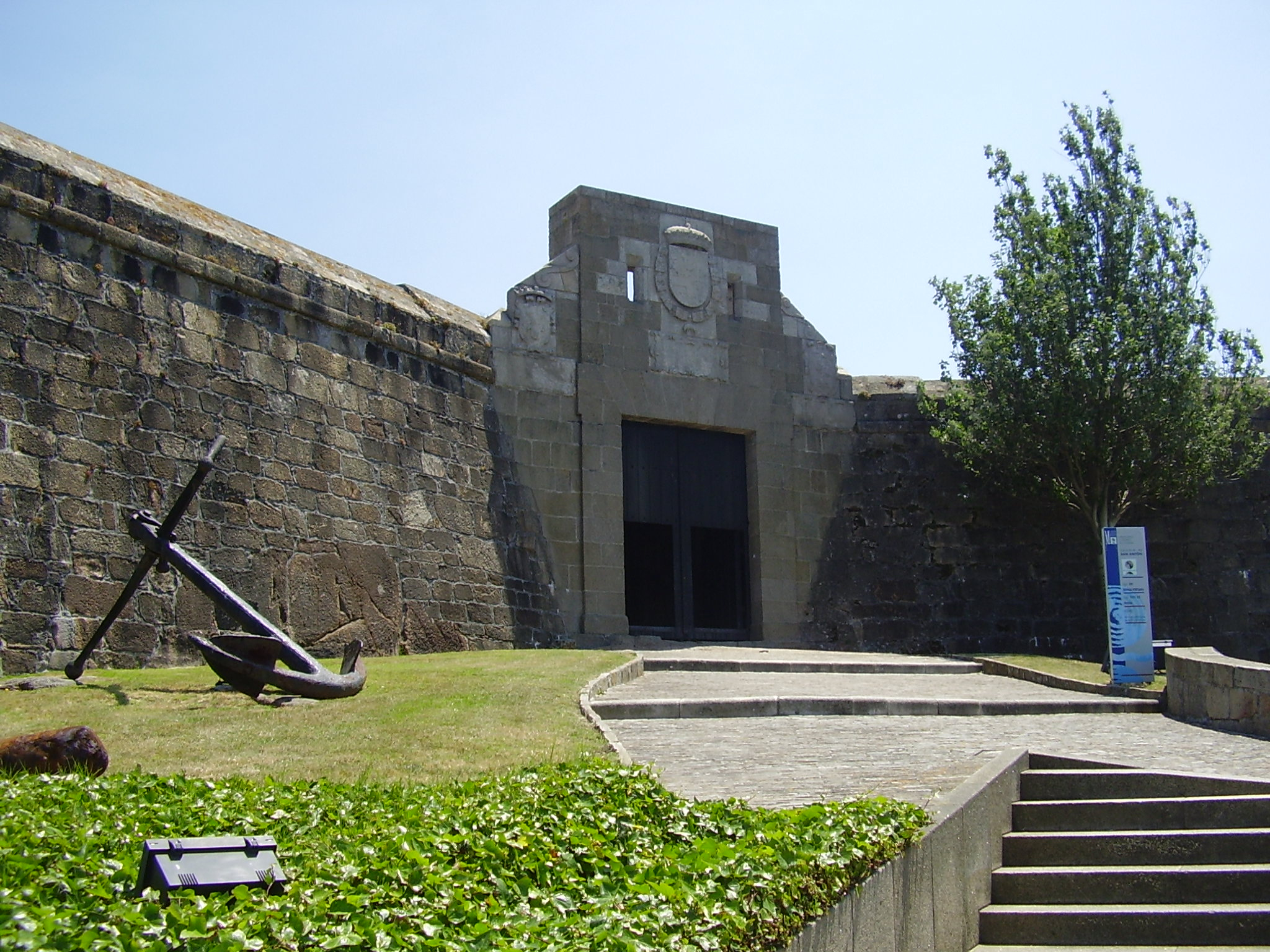
Castle of San Antón

== Modern era ==
Carlos I met in A Coruña the Courts that will proclaimed him emperor, and the Government of the Kingdom of Galicia was allowed between 1522 and 1529 to distribute in Europe spices. Commerce with the Indies was allowed between 1529 and 1575. As protection was built the Castle of San Antón.

From its port left in 1554 Philip II to married with Mary Tudor and in 1588 the Invincible Navy. In the following year Francis Drake besieged it, but he was rejected, and then it was born the legend of María Pita, a woman who took up the weapon of his dead man and continued shooting. After burning the monastery of San Domingos and other places, the English soldiers withdrew on May 19.

In the 16th and 17th centuries, the wars of the Spanish monarchy caused a high growth of the taxes and the compulsory recruitment of the population. In 1620, Philip III created the School of the Boys of the Sea. In 1682 the Tower of Hercules was restored by Antúnez.

== 19th century ==
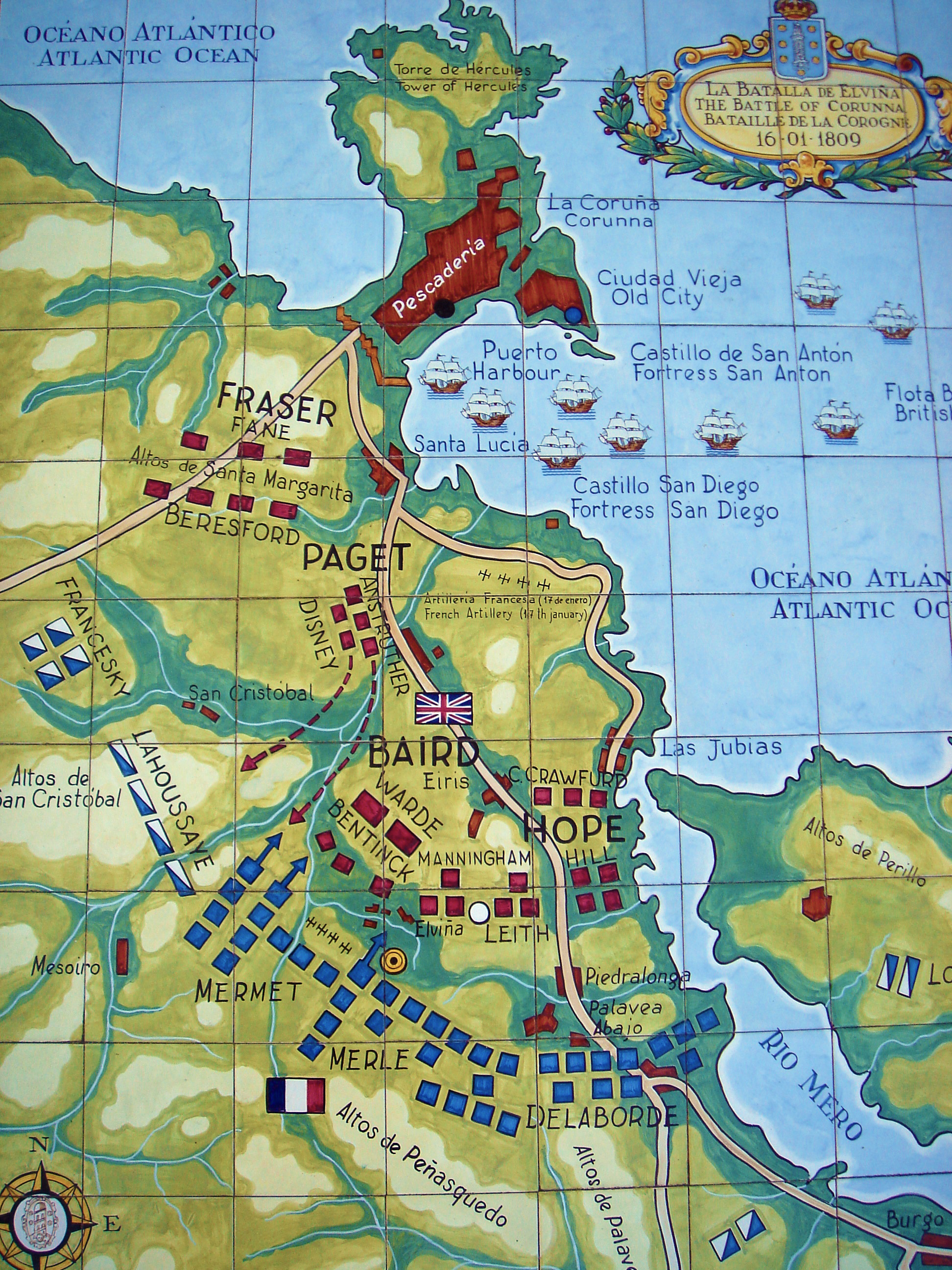
Mosaic with a commemorative map of the Battle of Elviña, placed where it is placed the yellow point (bottom left).

On August 19, 1815, Juan Díaz Porlier, "O Marquesiño", pronounced against Fernando VII in defense of the Spanish Constitution of 1812. He was supported by the bourgeoisie and the intellectual people. But on August 22 he was betrayed. Two months after that he was hanged in the Campo da Leña. In all the rebellions of the 19th century, A Coruña supported the liberal band. A Coruña also played an important role in the Rexurdimento, and the Galician Royal Academy and the Brotherhoods of the Galician Language were founded there, in 1906 and 1916 respectively.

Resistance during the Spanish independence war was led by Sinforiano López, and A Coruña was the only Galician city that achieved good results against the French troops. On January 16, 1809, in the Battle of Corunna, a British army under Lieutenant-General Sir John Moore conducted a fighting retreat and were able to withdraw by sea after repulsing French attempts to destroy them; Moore, however, was killed during the battle. French troops left Galicia at the end of May.

In 1804, the National Factory of Cigarettes was created, and the workers movement in the city began there. During the 19th century, other businesses were slowly established, related to glass, textiles, gas and matches. The sea-related business and the migrations attracted Catalan, Belgian, French and English inversions. The Bank of A Coruña was founded in 1857. The new provincial division of 1832 also influenced in the economic development.

== 20th century ==
At the beginning of the 20th century, A Coruña had about 45.000 inhabitants. After the decade of 1960, it recovered the business initiative that losts, with Barrié de la Maza (Banco Pastor, Fenosa, Aluminio de Galicia, Genosa, Emesa, etc.).

=== Elections of 1931 ===
In the Spanish general elections of 1931, all the political parties knew that the electoral results will had important political consequences. It was very important the campaign of Unión Monárquica in A Coruña, supported by El Ideal Gallego. Republicans and socialists constituted a block, integrated by ORGA, independent republicans, Spanish Socialist Workers' Party (PSOE) and the Partido Radical Socialista.

In the elections, the republican parties obtained 34 of the 39 council seats. The better results were of the ORGA and of the Partido Radical Socialista, and the Partido Radical lost a lot of support.

=== During the dictatorship of Francisco Franco ===
After the Spanish Civil War, supporters of the republic were forced to go to exile, and those that remained in the country suffered repression by the new government. Supporters of the fascist faction occupied all the charges of the "depurates", obtaining university titulations "by war". In the meantime, the Nazis murdered 13 citizens of A Coruña in Manthausen.

A group of franquists, led by Pedro Barrié, bought the Pazo de Meirás. They gave it to the dictator for his summer holidays. In 1970, ETA nearly killed Franco, but logistics failed at the last moment.

=== Democracy arrives again ===
From 1983 to 2006, the mayor of the city was Francisco Vázquez Vázquez (PSOE), and the city became a city of services, but he also was criticised because his offenses to the galician language and his urbanistic politics. On January 20, 2006 Paco Vázquez was named ambassador in Vatican City, and he was replaced by Javier Losada. Now the local government is a coalition of the two left-wing parties, Socialists' Party of Galicia and Galician Nationalist Bloc.

== See also ==
- Timeline of A Coruña
- Battle of Corunna
- The Siege of Coruña
