= Siege of Coruña =

1589 English–Spanish conflict

- Part of the Anglo–Spanish War (1585–1604) and the Eighty Years' War
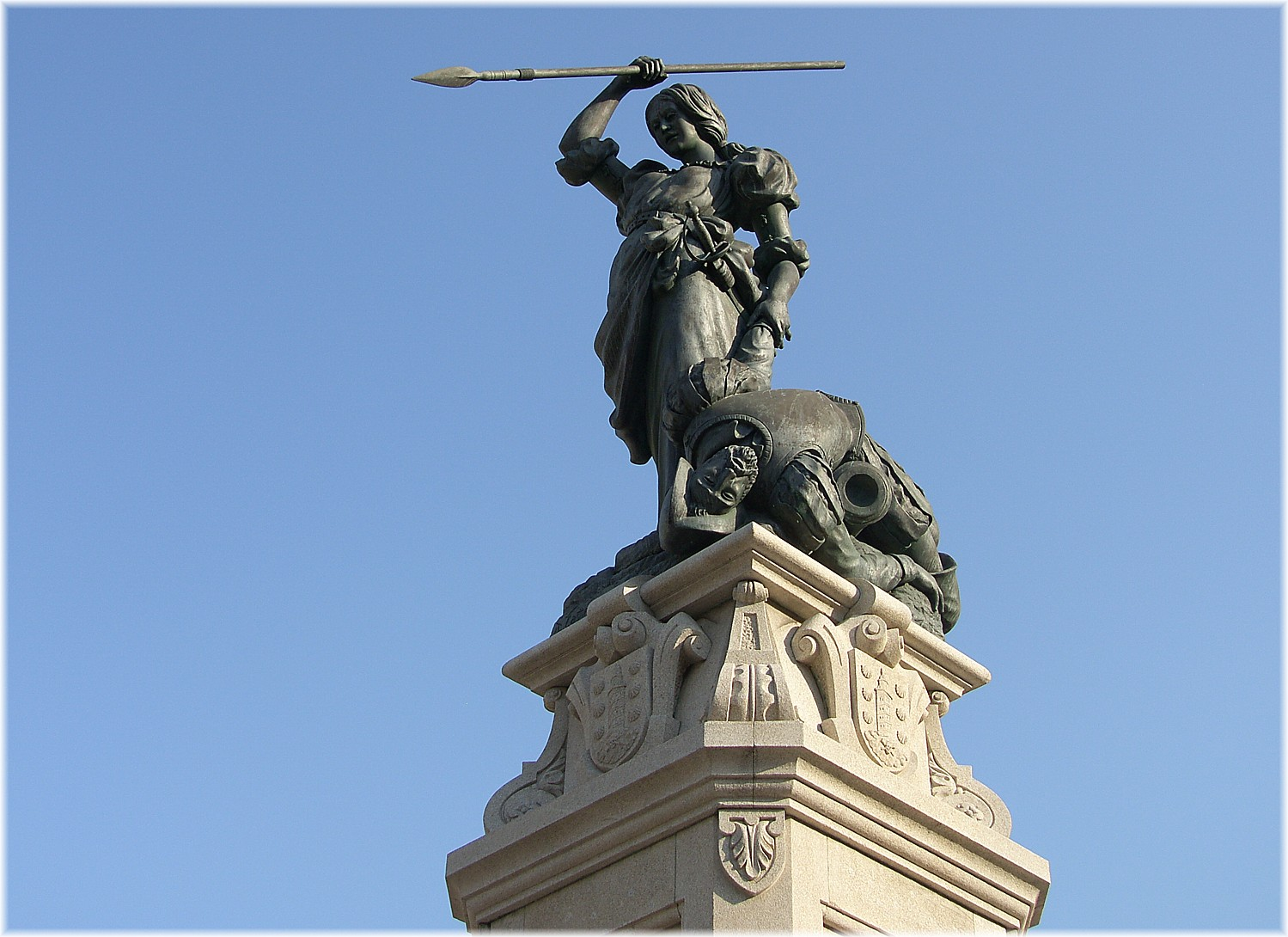
- Monument of the heroine Maria Pita in the Square of the Town Hall of A Coruña
Date	4 – 18 May 1589
Location	A Coruña, (Galicia)
Result	Spanish victory

Belligerents
Kingdom of England (Dutch Republic) United Provinces	Iberian Union: (Spain) Spanish Empire; Kingdom of Portugal

Commanders and leaders
Elizabeth I of England; Robert Devereux; Francis Drake; John Norris; Edward Norris	Philip II of Spain Marquis of Cerralbo; Álvaro Troncoso

Strength
Six galleons 60 armed merchant vessels 60 Dutch flyboats 20 pinnaces 27,667 men Total: 180+ ships	1 galleon 1,500 men

Casualties and losses
1,500 killed or died 3 large ships sunk or captured 1,000 deserted on ten small ships	1,000+ killed, wounded or captured, 400+ Civilians killed great material destruction in the lower city 3 galleons sunk or scuttled

The siege of Coruña, also known as the defence of Corunna, was a series of military encounters between the English Armada and the defenders of the fishermen's city of Coruña in Galicia that lasted for two weeks in May 1589. The siege was the first interaction between the English Armada, a retaliatory English expedition within the Anglo-Spanish war, and the Spanish troops, and set the tone for the rest of the campaign. The siege ended in failure, and the English moved on to besiege Lisbon.

== Background ==
The English Armada was considerably larger than the 137-ship-strong Spanish Armada. Drake commanded some 180 ships which was made up of six Royal galleons, 60 English armed merchantmen, 60 Dutch flyboats and about 20 pinnaces. It transported 23,375 soldiers. In addition to the troops, there were 4,000 sailors and 1,500 officers and gentlemen adventurers. Drake assigned his vessels to five squadrons, led respectively by himself in the Revenge, Sir John Norris in the Nonpareil, Norris's brother Edward in the Foresight, Thomas Fenner in the Dreadnought, and Roger Williams in the Swiftsure. Also sailing with them – against the Queen's express orders – was the Earl of Essex and the pretender to the Portuguese throne supported by England.

Drake and Norris had orders from Queen Elizabeth to first attack Santander, where most of the surviving galleons from the Spanish Armada were being kept, and destroy the Spanish fleet. He also had to placate the fleet's commanders and investors who wanted the first objective to be landing in Lisbon. Drake chose to ignore them, alleging unfavourable winds and too much risk of becoming embayed by the Spaniards in the Bay of Biscay. He headed in a different direction and attacked Coruña instead. His behavior suggests that his goal in taking this simple fishing town was either to establish a base of operations or to raid it for booty. The latter seems most plausible since this expedition was privately funded and Drake had investors to satisfy. He might have been gathering supplies for a long struggle in Santander.

When the expedition arrived, Coruña was a small fishing village with a healthy economy due to the frequency with which ships stopped in its harbor, but only about 4,000 permanent inhabitants. At that time the army was concentrated in Santander, where an attack was expected, and the rest of the region was almost defenceless. To face the English Armada the city counted two galleons; the Regazona 1,294 tons, (San Juan, with 50 cannons ), the small galleon San Bernardo with 21 cannons, which couldn't sail at the time, two galleys (Diana and Princesa with 20 cannons each), and two other smaller ships (San Bartolomé with 27 cannons and the urca Sansón with 18). Regarding infantry, a combination of militia, hidalgos and the few available soldiers summed up to 1200 men, much of them with questionable levels of military training, except for the seven companies of old tercios who happened to be resting in the city after their return from war. Most of the garrison was concentrated in the lower district of Pescaderìà. Of course, it also had the medieval city walls, built in the 13th century, and a couple of medieval fortifications built around the river at the same period. The Spanish soldiers were led by Juan Pacheco de Toledo, Marques de Cerralbo, the governor of Coruña, and garrison commander Álvaro Troncoso.

=== Landing ===
The English Armada arrived on 4 May, where they came under fire by the cannons of the Castle of San Antón, forcing two English ships to run aground, though the rest of the English fleet kept out of range. Initially, 8,000 soldiers disembarked in the beach of Santa María de Oza led by Norris. Álvaro de Troncoso y Ulloa came out to meet him with the 150 tercio's arquebusiers he had available, to defend the beach. They spread out to give the impression of a much larger number and opened heavy fire on the 8,000 soldiers. Troncoso was familiar with the local geography, even if the arquebusiers were not, and under his command the Spaniards moved around quickly, effectively disconcerting the attackers and forcing them to retreat back towards the ships. This gave enough time for the lighthouse fire to be lighted as an alert for the entire region. Norris's men took various losses and many were wounded; the less experienced soldiers panicked under the initial disconcert. When the invaders realized how many enemies they were really facing, Norris ordered his men to surround the Spanish, who immediately retreated towards the little Fort of Malvecín, near the "wall of the fish market". Their ability to repel the first English attack was a huge morale boost for the retreating defenders. Troncoso led a similar sortie in an attempt to prevent the English from taking the hill of Santa Lucía, and was initially successful, but his outnumbered arquebusiers were soon forced to retreat back to the city.

Having defeated the Spanish sorties, the English completed the encirclement of the city by the end of the day. That night, two companies arrived to reinforce the city from Betanzos, but were blocked from entering the city by an English encampment. However, Captain Juan de Varela led the divisions through the English lines, reaching the city by dawn. When the Betanzos captains protested the plan due to the lack of gunpowder, Valera replied that "The Spaniard's real power in times of need is the sword."

On the 5th of May, 4 ships carrying three bronze cannons left the rest of the English fleet, attempting to land onshore and place the cannons on a cliff edge to bombard the walls of Pescaderíá. The Spanish galleys, the 'Diana' and the 'Princesa', left the city and attempted to stop the transports, but after failing to do so did not return to the city, but instead sailed to the Port of Ferrol, abandoning the siege. When informed of the news, Captain Varela is said to have remarked "If His Majesty were to give him new coats of arms for their exploits, on the border it should read, as it says in the Gospel, Blessed are the peacemakers, for they shall inherit the Earth."

Once the bronze cannons were in place, the English began shelling the walls. They were allowed to do so without interruption, until they suddenly found themselves under heavy fire from the Castillo de San Antón and from the ships San Juan and San Bartolomé. The struggle between the two ships and the English artillery batteries was fierce. Norris's men took heavy losses, and at least two English cannons were put out of action They then tried to board the ships from land, unsuccessfully. After a long struggle, Norris gradually got the upper hand. A group of about fourteen soldiers managed to board the San Juan. Given the state of the ship, the Spanish gathered the gunpowder until the English soldiers were aboard, then blew the ship up as they jumped off it; fourteen soldiers were killed in the explosion, others were injured. The San Bartolomé continued to fight against the entire enemy artillery for a long time still, but was finally sunk by the Spanish in a similar way, to avoid its capture, before they retreated back to the castle.

== Siege ==
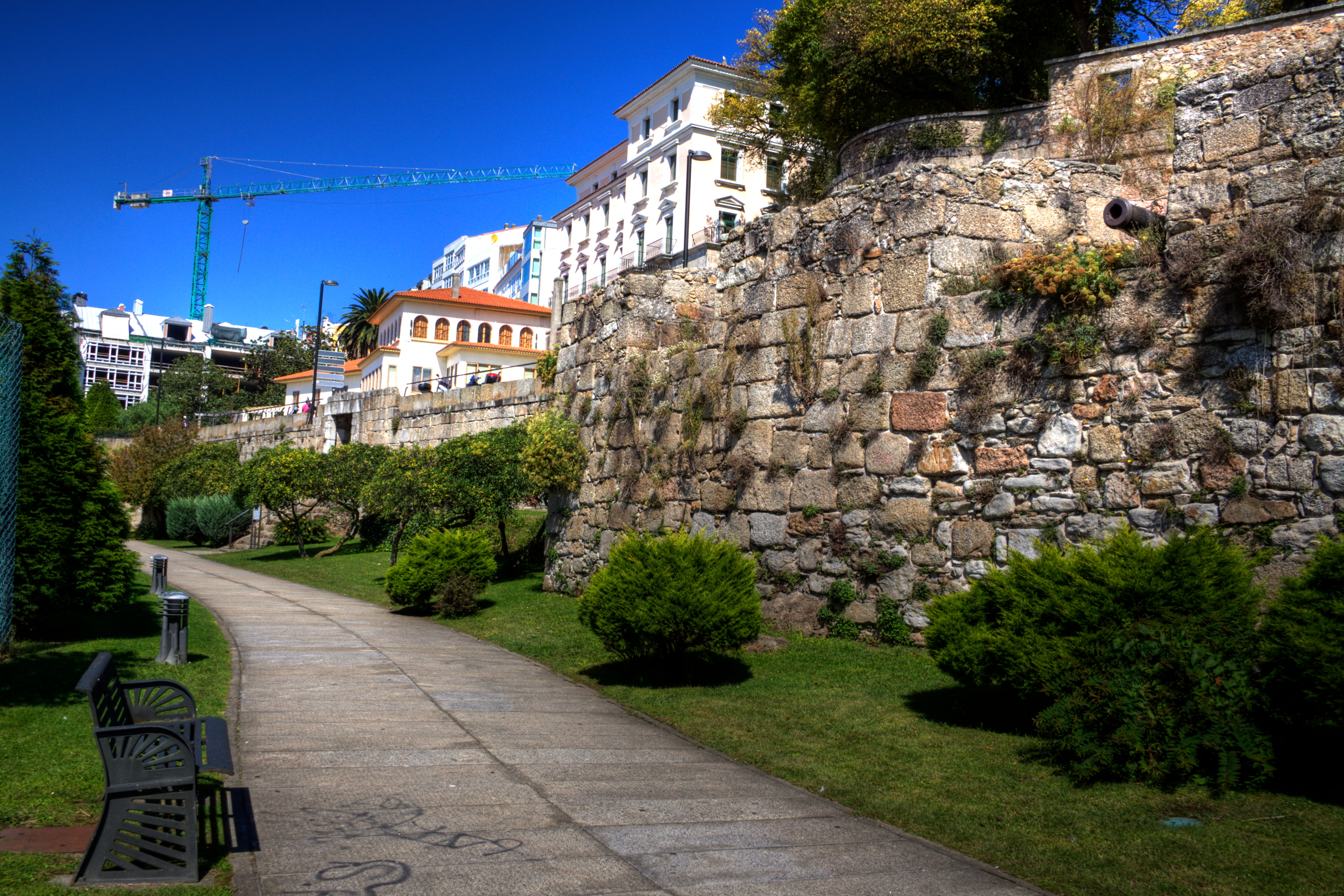
A Coruña city wall

The defenders that had not participated in the fight were behind the city walls and could not assist those outside. Without the ships, the inhabitants of Pescaderìà, outside the medieval walls, could do nothing to prevent 1.500 soldiers from circling the beach and disembarking behind the church of San Xurxo on the night of May the 5th. They landed at the feet of the "upper city", the line of the medieval nucleus of the village, effectively surrounding the Spanish defenders. At the same time, the English launched a full assault against the wall, and in order to avoid being surrounded, the Marquis of Cerralbo ordered a retreat to the 'high town'. The English troops took the poor neighbourhoods of the lower city without much difficulty, and they took reprisals for the heavy casualties suffered during the two previous days on the inhabitants of the lower city and looted every patch of the city outside the walls. 400 Spaniards were killed that night, women and children included, adding to the 100 who died fighting during the day. The reaction came the next morning when a group of 1400 voluntary men under the orders of Captain Juan de Varela charged towards the English troops camped in the lower city and enacted heavy losses on them. When word of the events of the 5th spread new volunteers came from Santiago and the nearby mountains until there were 2400 Spanish in the Mount Arras under the command of Count Andrade outside the city walls, harassing Blake's men as they tried to prepare the siege. Not much compared to the more than 23000 English men on the beach, but the guerrilla strategies they used were particularly effective in the forested hills of Coruña.

The naval blockade was particularly ineffective for reasons unknown to the besieging army, and there were no signs of shortage of supplies in the city. The reason was that Spanish barques regularly managed to sneak past the English fleet to gather supplies and returned to the city unnoticed. Despite the huge numbers of the besieging force the Spanish still managed to break the siege often and come in and out. They probably had a better supply system than the English Armada did, since the area is poor in both food and fresh water and not too densely populated. To try to prevent the constant breaking of their siege the captains of the attackers ordered the tightening of the siege, gathering even more people more closely together. Later in the campaign, the troops suffered disease outbreaks that swept through various ships. It is reasonable to think they originated here.

After taking the lower city, Norris surrounded the high town, where the remaining defenders fortified themselves. Norris decided to close lines and focus on breaching the walls, while from the inside the defenders kept attacking constantly. It is said that for days the entire city took turns to eat and sleep, while they spent the rest of the time defending the walls and repairing cracks in them. Two attempts at assaulting the walls were repelled by the inhabitants of the city, who turned the attackers back at the Puerta Real gate, while the stress caused by the stalk, hit and run strategies carried out by Valera's men affected the morale of Blake's men, causing many desertions. On 12 May a mine was detonated near the Santo Domingo monastery, but the tunnel was dug to short and the mine failed.

=== Breach in the wall ===
After days of work and various mines, the walls broke on 14 May due to a mine explosion. Though the women of the town had built an embankment behind the wall that redirected the mine blast back at the English and killed 300 of them, the wall itself still crumbled. Pedro Ponce and the citizens covering that side of the wall prevented Norris' soldiers from advancing into the city, however. Later in the evening, a second explosion opened another breach in the wall. The side of the wall was covered by Troncoso and his men, who repelled the initial attack.

Norris then ordered ten companies to charge in through the a second breach created by their artillery. He charged along with his best soldiers on the first line. They broke the resistance and entered the city followed by the bulk of the English army. The women of the city, many of whom had survived the chaos of 5 May, came to help Troncoso's men armed with pikes and knives and led by Maria Pita charged against Norris and his soldiers. It is said that an English commander carrying a banner, who was leading the assault to the highest part of the wall, was killed by María Pita who, snatched the spear carrying the English banner from the commander and threw it at him. This demoralized the English troops, composed of 12,000 men, who began to retreat. She then appeared on the top of the wall herself, shouting: Quen teña honra, que me siga ("Whoever has honour, follow me!") whereupon the English incursion was driven back by the defenders. At the other breach, Inés de Ben (a storekeeper in the lower city) lead another charge against the soldiers entering through the destroyed wall. After more than two-hours of sustained English assaults, the attackers were forced to retreat. The English suffered considerable losses in both assaults, losing around 500 to 600 men, while the Spanish suffered 150 dead.

While that was going on, the English simultaneously carried out an unsuccessful attack on the Castle of San Antón. Forty launches carrying troops and artillery tried to disembark near the castle, but two ships were sunk by the cannons of the fort, causing the rest of the launches to retreat.

=== Battle of El Burgo bridge ===
On the 16th of May Norris led a sizable force out of the city to crush the Spanish forces under Count Andrade, who, had crossed the bridge of El Burgo five miles south of Coruña. Norris at once set off to take the bridge and drive the Spanish away, but with only 1,700 men the first attempt failed after the Spanish charged and broke the Englishmen crossing the bridge. Another charge was ordered, but with Count Andrade personally leading the Spanish counter-charge the assault failed. The Spanish began to entrench themselves around the bridge but after reinforcements from Colonel Sidney and Captain Cooper, Norris was able to lead nine regiments of pikemen and musketeers totalling 6,000. With the push of the pike the English managed to drive the Spanish back over the narrow two hundred yard long bridge which spanned a river and were then able to surround and barricade them. In the ensuing fight and under hail of musket fire over 1,000 were killed wounded or captured, Norris captured a Spanish Royal Standard as a trophy. English casualties numbered around 300 men and included Edward Noriss who was wounded by a sword slash to the head. The victorious English then went out into the countryside and laid waste to many villages.

=== English retreat ===
Later that day they got word that Spanish reinforcements were arriving from Santander to relieve the city. After burning the monastery of Santo Domingo they raised the siege, reembarked, then sailed to Lisbon.

Despite vastly outnumbering the defenders, the English army failed to take the city and suffered heavy casualties.

== Aftermath ==
The English army lost over 1,500 men in the siege, three large ships, and four landing barges, and had to leave without supplies and carrying hundreds of injured. The worst damage was probably to the morale of the men. After being repeatedly defeated by civilians and women, it was dangerously low. Indiscipline and discontentment increased. When Drake ordered the fleet to head to Lisbon, 1,000 of his men, on ten small ships, deserted and returned to England.

The human loses to the city were of about 1,000 people, counting men, women, and children, plus great material damage to the lower city. At his arrival, Philip II gave Maria Pita the rank of "permanent second lieutenant of the city", with the corresponding salary for her and for other leaders of the popular defence.

== See also ==
- Maria Pita
- History of A Coruña
- Timeline of A Coruña
