= Francisco Franco del Amo =

Spanish academic and author (1960–2021)

Francisco José Franco del Amo (1960 in Bergondo, A Coruña – 27 September 2021 in A Coruña) was a Spanish academic and author.

Franco del Amo earned his PhD in Biology at the University of Santiago de Compostela in 1990. From 1990 to 1992 he worked as a post-doctoral fellow at the Roche Institute of Molecular Biology (Nutley, New Jersey, USA). Upon his return to Spain, he joined the University of Santiago de Compostela as Associated Researcher (1992–1994) and Assistant Professor (1994–1996). In 1995 he joined the technical team in the Museos Científicos Coruñeses (www.casaciencias.org), an institution where he then took on different roles. He was part of the team of museologists who designed the Aquarium Finisterrae and of the group of technicians who directed its setup. Since 2002 he was the Technical Director of the Aquarium Finisterrae.

As a researcher, Francisco Franco published 12 research articles and directed a doctoral thesis. As a science communicator, he had published hundreds of articles and several monographs. He collaborated with the TV programme “La Aventura del Saber” on the Segunda Cadena channel. Since 1996, he contributed regularly to the supplement “La Voz de la Escuela”, in the newspaper La Voz de Galicia, and to the programme “Protagonistas de A Coruña” on the Onda Cero radio, Spain.
