= Aquarium Finisterrae =

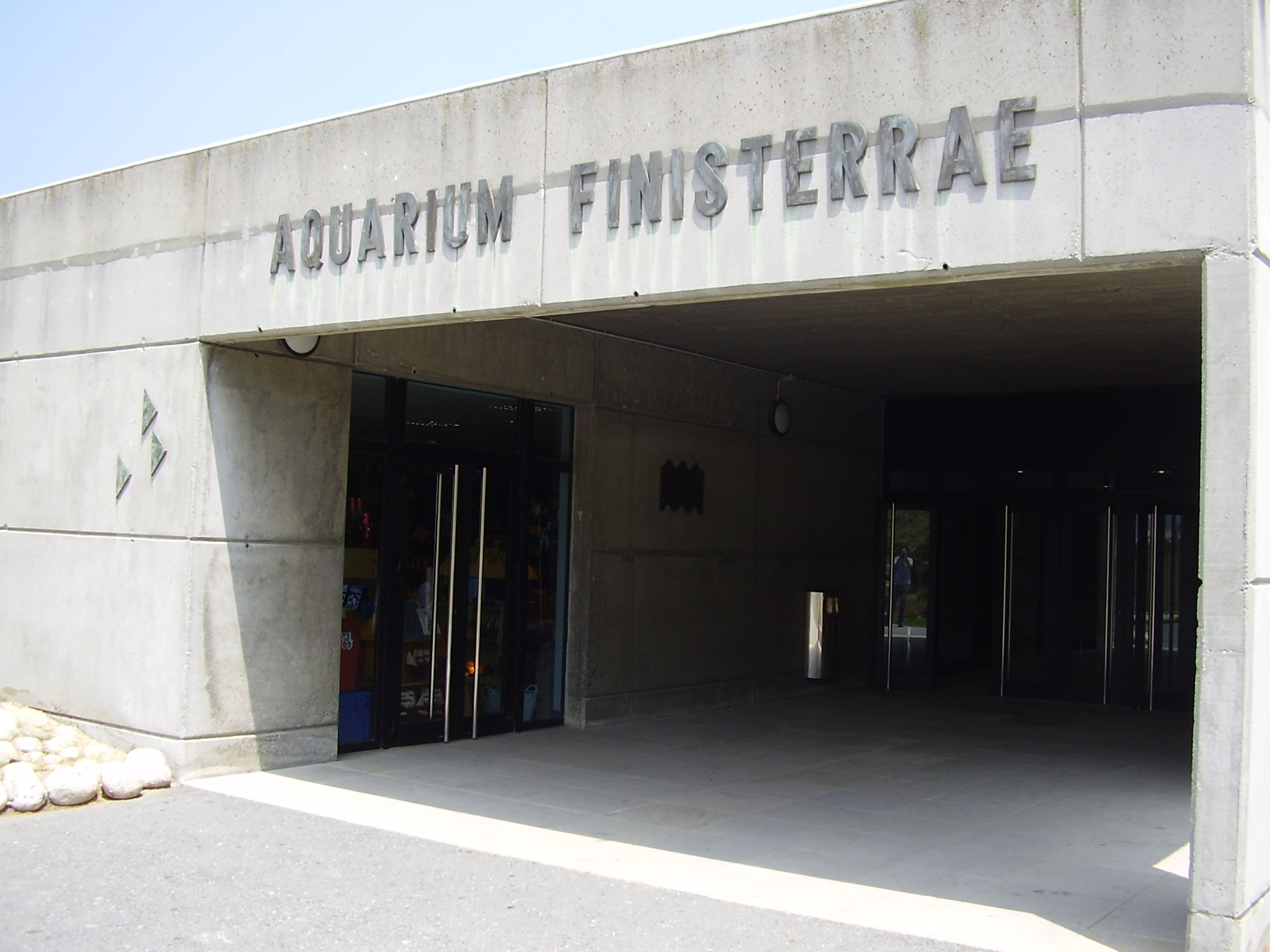
- Aquarium entrance
- Interactive map of Aquarium Finisterrae
- 43.3840°N 8.4098°W
- Date opened: June 5, 1999
- Location: A Coruña, Galicia, Spain
- No. of species: >600
- Volume of largest tank: 4,400,000 litres (1,200,000 US gal)
- Website: www.coruna.gal/mc2/gl

Aquarium Finisterrae (Aquarium of the end of the world) is an aquarium located in A Coruña, Galicia, Spain. It is an interactive centre of the sciences of marine biology and oceanography. It advocates wildlife preservation, particularly the sea ecosystem and sea life.

Founded by the city of A Coruña, it was inaugurated on June 5, 1999. It is directed by Ramón Núñez Centella. Francisco Franco del Amo was the technical director from its opening until his death in 2021.

It is located on the coast of A Coruña, in the Maritime Pass, between the Domus (museum) and the Tower of Hercules. Its exterior pools are connected to the Atlantic Ocean.

== Distribution ==
- Sala maremágnum: An interactive exposition room that focuses on the Atlantic Ocean. It houses more than 600 Atlantic species.
- Sala Humboldt: A room containing expositions about sea ecosystems.
- Sala Nautilus: A room decorated in the style of the study of Captain Nemo in the Nautilus. It is an observation room in a pool of 4,400,000 litres (1,200,000 US gal) (among the largest in Europe) containing fish from the Atlantic ocean.
- Octopus' Garden: A room dedicated to octopuses.
- Jardín botánico: A room containing species representative of the Galician coast.
- Piscinarium: Includes seals from the Atlantic ocean.
- Sala Isabel Castelo: A room that includes a permanent exposition of nature photographs.

== Sala Maremágnum ==
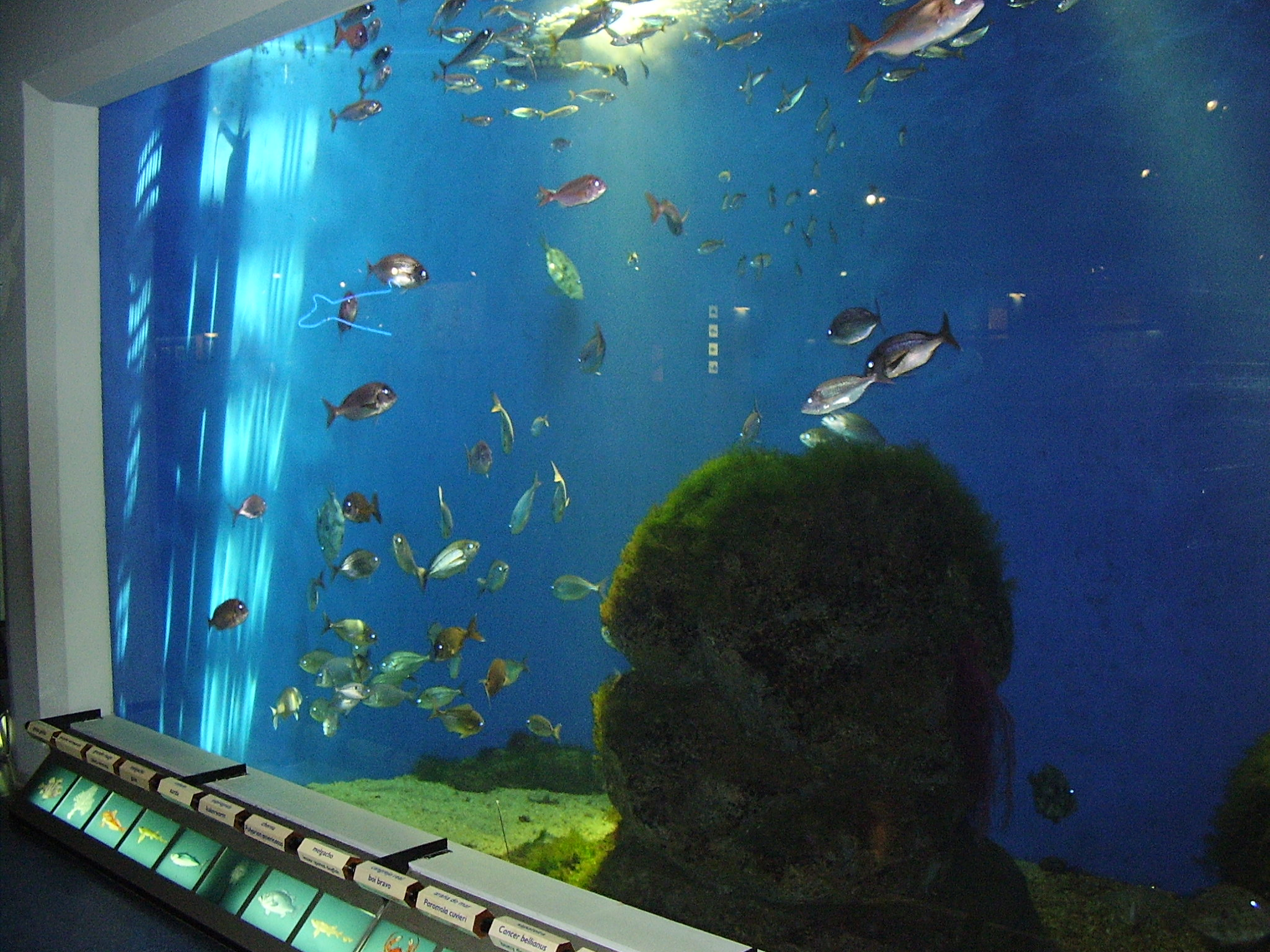
One of the Aquaria of the Sala Maremágnum

The largest of the aquaria is the Atlantic Ocean exposition room. Each of the modules has a question as its title which was selected by the readers of the newspaper La Voz de Galicia before the aquarium's inauguration.

Between the interactive modules, the Charca de las caricias (Stroking pool) is where visitors can touch some of the marine life. There are also modules dedicated to nautical knots, fish smells, parrot songs and the amount of water that can be soaked up by a sponge.

There are various modules that are not interactive, like the tank of jellyfish, the small exposition of marine fossils, and the aquarium of sea horses. The most important is the circular tank at the entrance of the room, dedicated to the presentation of a particular animal. The animals presented change every so often.

The five aquaria of the greatest volume are found separated from the rest of the room by steps. Each one of them represents a different environment of the Galician coast, from the cliffs to the continental shelf. In these, among other things, are morays, congers, lophii, groupers, Scorpaenae, and John Dory.

The aquarium also has a BioHut nursery for marine organisms as part of the Ocean Connections project.

== Sala Humboldt ==
The Sala Humboldt is dedicated to temporary expositions that change around every two years. The first were dedicated to Caribbean fish.

== Sala Nautilus ==
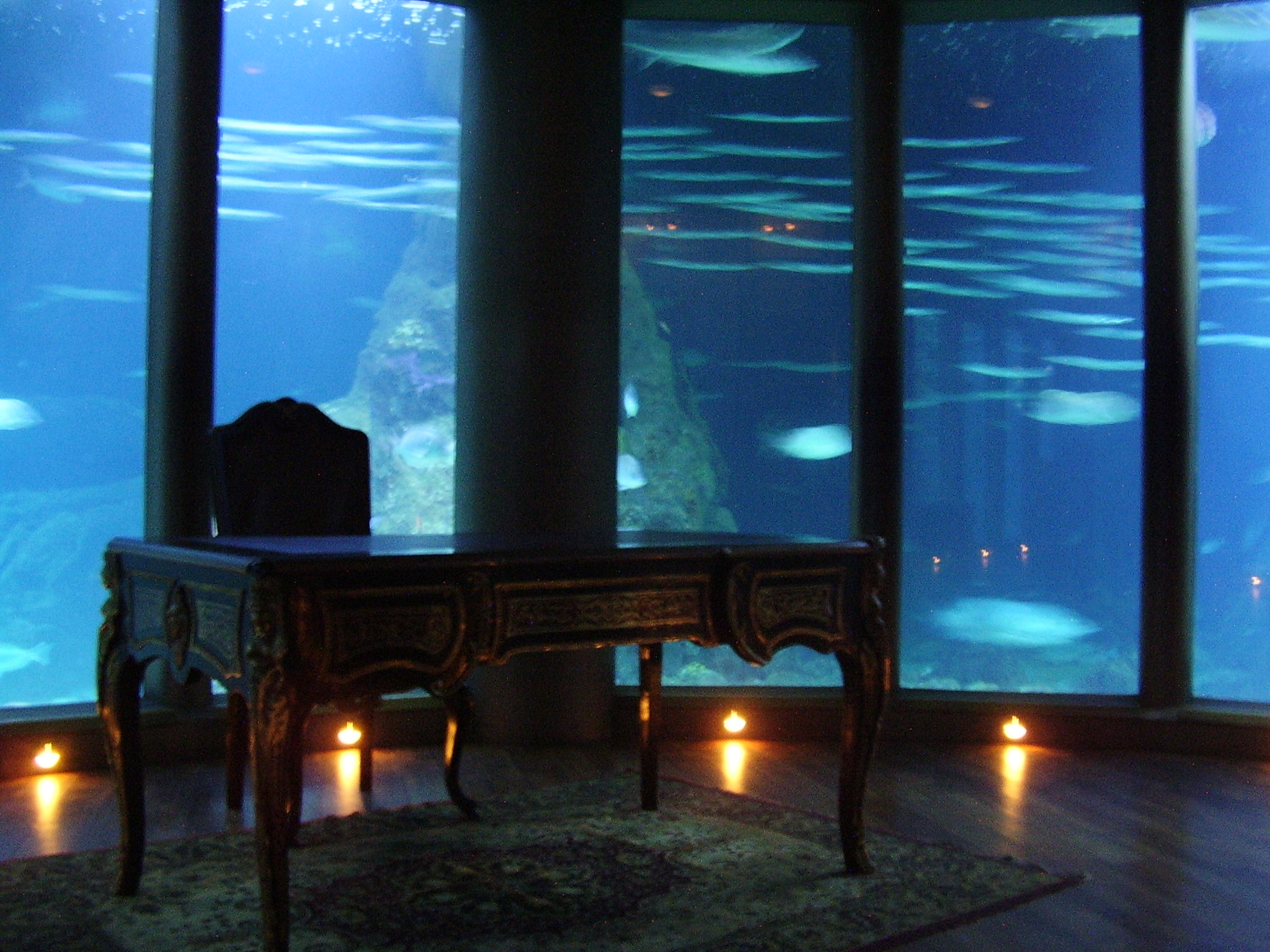
Cabinet of Captain Nemo en in the Sala Nautilus of the Aquarium Finisterrae

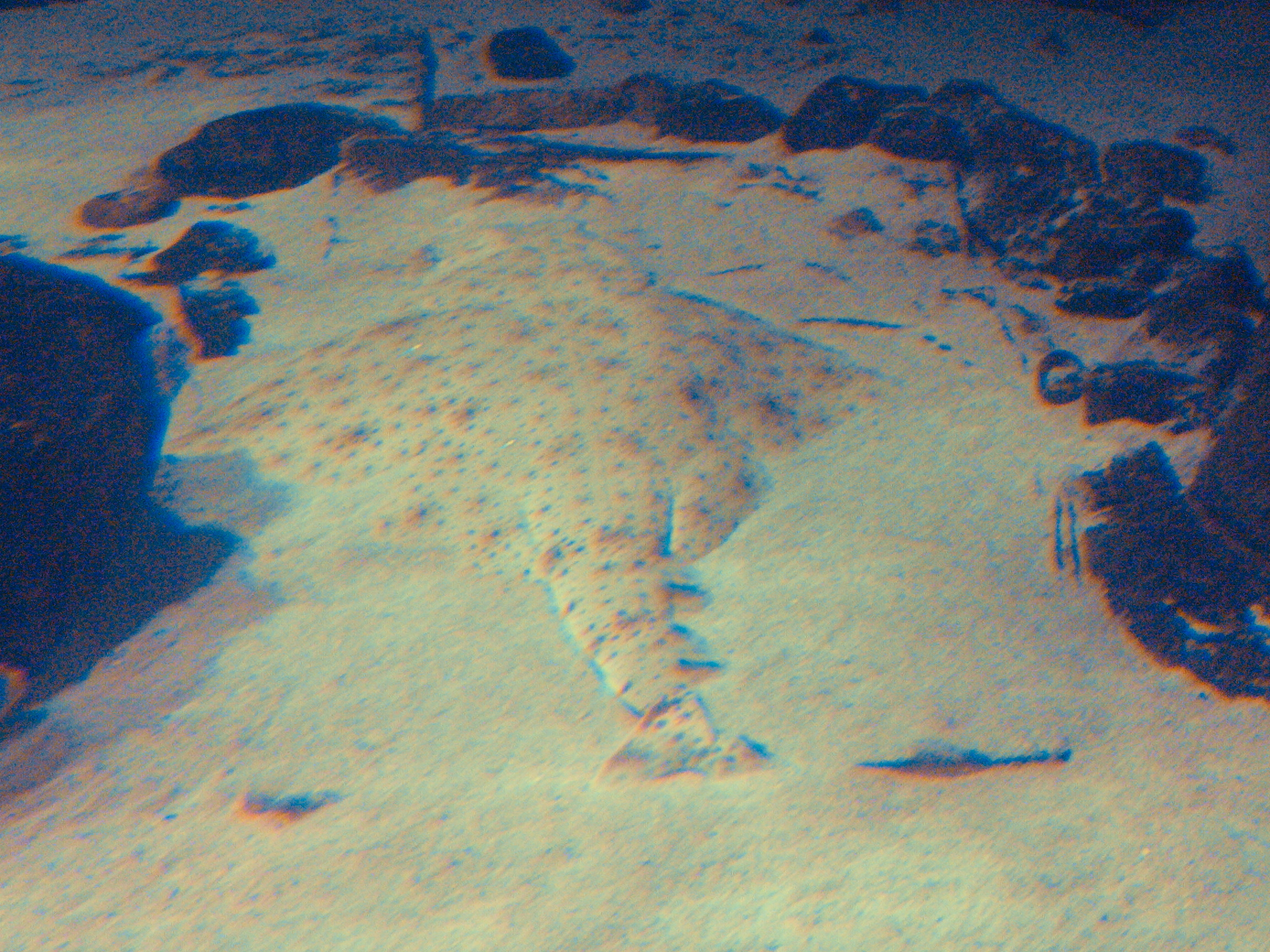
Angel shark in the Sala Nautilus

Through 48 windows in a room decorated like Captain Nemo's study in the Nautilus, Sala Nautilus is an observation room immersed in a 4,400,000-litre (970,000 imp gal; 1,200,000 US gal) pool containing 700 fish of 34 different species: sand sharks, amberfish, amberjacks, yellowtails, groupers, ocean sunfish; there are also different kinds of sharks like school sharks, angel sharks, spiny dogfish, hound sharks, nursehounds and catsharks as well as frequenters of the Galician coast like sea bass, red gurnards, immense turbots, skates and filefish. One of the major attractions introduced on May 24, 2006 is Gastón, a 3 m (9.8 ft), 100 kg (220 lb) male sand shark (Carcharias taurus) from the Océanopolis aquarium in Brest, France. With him lives a female sand shark named Hermosa.

The inside of the Nautilus room pays homage to the 1870 book from which it originated, Twenty Thousand Leagues Under the Seas by Jules Verne. The room is packed with posters showing various copies of the book and movie posters of several film adaptations and in different languages.

The room is also made to be a replica of the study as described in the book. A collection of objects—furniture, plates, catalogs, scientific apparatuses, paintings, engravings, sea shells, animal and mineral samples, nautical apparatuses and objects, navigational charts, and personal objects—all date to the second half of the nineteenth century and are related to the character of Jules Verne's novel.

The room also has leather-covered Chester armchairs, old maps, and period mirrors that reflect distorted images. The atmosphere is completed with a 20-minute symphony, containing several passages of organ music, specially composed by Luis Delgado for this room.

== Exterior ==
In the Terraza exterior one is exposed to art about fishing, the cabin of the fishing vessel María del Carmen, and the anchor of the oil tanker Mar Egeo that ran aground on December 3, 1992 spilling oil.

From here one can access the Paraíso Marino which receives water directly from the sea and inhabited by three male seals: Altair, Gregor and Hansi. If you look to the left of the aquarium building you can see a Jardín Botánico that contains many of the species present on the Galician coast.

The Piscinarium contains six female seals: Bine, Deneb, Lara, Paula, Petra and Vega.

Finally, the Octopus' Garden contains a place to observe the behavior of octopuses.
