= Aegean Sea tanker oil spill =

1992 environmental disaster off the coast of Galicia, Spain

Coordinates: 43.389°N 8.410°W

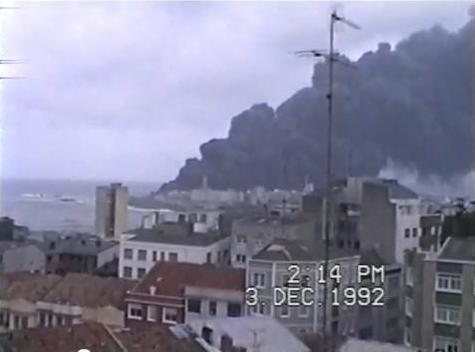
Aegean Sea burning off the coast of A Coruña (Galicia, Spain)

The Aegean Sea tanker oil spill was a spill that occurred on 3 December 1992 when the double-bottomed Greek-flagged oil tanker, Aegean Sea, en route to the Repsol refinery in A Coruña, Spain, suffered an accident off the Galician coast. The ship had successfully passed all required tests and revisions. The accident occurred during extreme weather conditions and affected the Galician coast resulting in ecosystem damage, as well as damage to the fishing and tourist industries in A Coruña.

== Incident ==
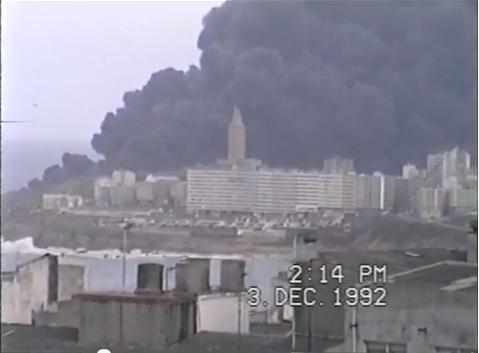
Aegean Sea burning behind the Tower of Hercules

On 3 December 1992, the Greek oil-ore carrier Aegean Sea was en route to A Coruña, Spain, from Sullom Voe, Scotland. As the vessel prepared to enter the docks of A Coruña, the wind speed was above 50 kn (93 km/h; 58 mph), and visibility was under 100 m (110 yd), causing her to lose her assigned course and run aground off the coast of Galicia, near the Tower of Hercules.

A rescue team was sent immediately, and a helicopter was able to rescue all of the thirty-two man crew. However, the ship broke in half, allowing the release of 67,000 tonnes of the 79,000 tonnes of light crude oil the ship was carrying. Spilled oil was contained through the use of booms, skimmers, and pumps, and with half of the ship still above water, the rescue team used pumps to drain the still intact tanks. Soon after, however, the ship caught on fire and continued to burn for a period of five days. The city of A Coruña was temporarily evacuated to protect its citizens from the hazards of the oil smoke. The remaining oil drifted with the strong currents produced by the wind, and as much as 300 km of coast line, as well as sea life along the coast, were affected by the spill.

The two anchors of Aegean Sea were recovered, and are now on display at Aquarium Finisterrae in A Coruña, and at the Philippe Cousteau Museum at Salinas, Asturias.

== Clean-up process ==
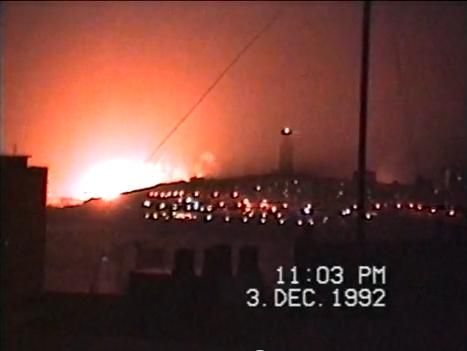
Tower of Hercules in the light of the flames of the Aegean Sea oil tanker

Clean-up crews were immediately sent to the disaster site, both on and offshore. Oil booms were placed around the spill in order to contain the oil. The booms collected around 5,000 cubic meters of an oil/water mixture. On shore, 1,200 cubic meters of contaminated sand and debris were treated for oil. Since only the bow of Aegean Sea had sunk, pumps were placed in the stern that pumped out the remaining oil.

== Aftermath and investigation ==
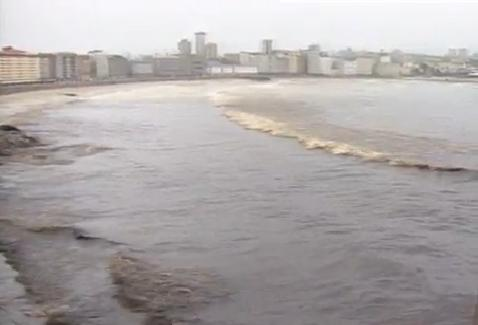
Oil spill after the accident

The Aegean Sea oil spill affected countless amounts of sea life. A Coruña's fishing industry received the hardest blow, with the ban of all fishing by the Fisheries Council. A claim for fishermens' assistance that totalled nearly 3.53 million dollars was implemented soon after the oil spill. Although the Fisheries Council aided the fishers with some reimbursements, these were nowhere close to fully compensating the fishermens' losses. A flood of claims from fishermen and the tourist industry came to the Spanish Court, totalling around 287 million dollars by 2001. Most of these claims were settled, but some claims remain litigious. The International Oil Pollution Compensation (IOPC), the Spanish Government, and the ship owner finally came to a settlement, with the last payment made in December 2003. In addition to the monetary settlements, the captain, Constantine Stavrides, and the pilot were also found criminally liable for negligence and for failing to follow regulations.

== Hydrocarbon study ==
Hydrocarbons, being a significant source of energy due to their strong chemical bonds, were a prime source for scientific study in the Aegean Sea oil spill. Chemical markers were placed in a sample of the crude oil spilled, with interesting data revealed. Alkanes and acyclic hydrocarbons, both having single bonds, appeared to have deteriorated in only six months, while triterpane and steranane were still present after years of weathering. Both triterpane and steranane have multiple bonds, which is the reason they were still present after so many years. Researchers concluded that chemical markers can be of effective use against oil spills. These markers can allow scientists to determine how long the oil has contaminated seawater, and how the seawater affects the oil collected with water. This can be helpful in the process where spilled oil is collected and processed for reuse. Chemical markers may now be placed in the oil to determine how much the oil must be cleaned to be satisfactory for use.

== Ecosystem study ==
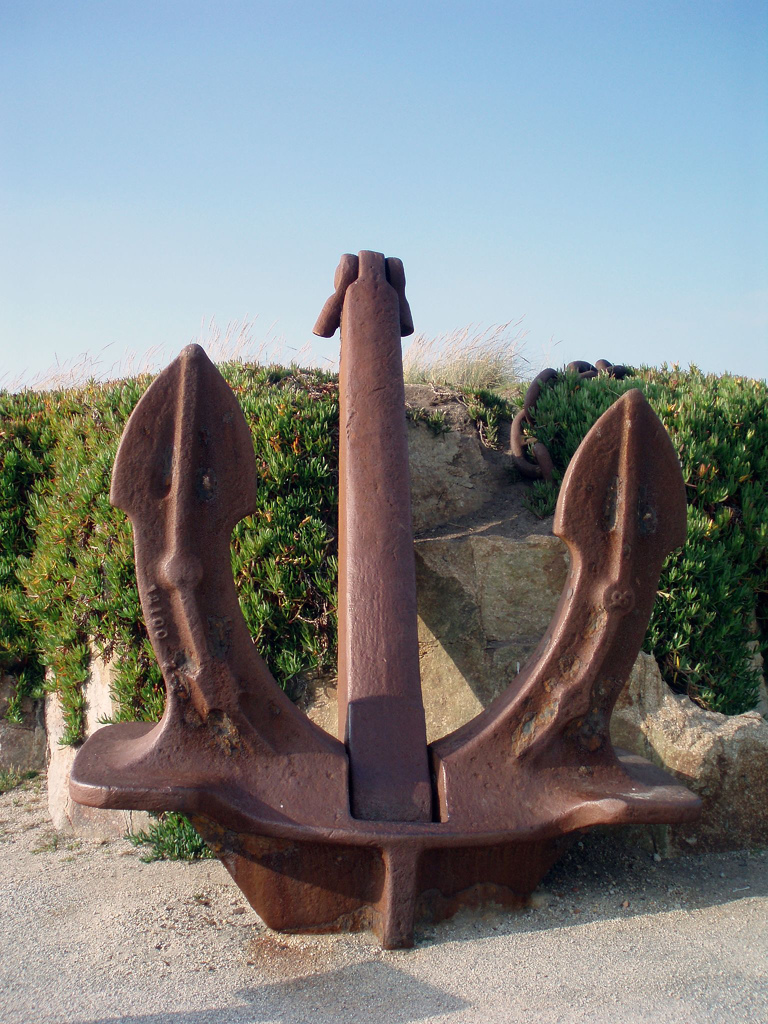
The anchor of Aegean Sea at Aquarium Finisterrae in A Coruña, Galicia, Spain

The Galician coast was an extremely vital source of income for Spain's fishing industry. Crab and lobster harvesting, salmon farming, and the main profit industry of shellfish farming were all affected by the spill. Soon after the oil spill, Spain ordered a study of the ecosystem in order to evaluate the damage done to the benthic fauna in the region, and muddy sediments. This study was enforced due to the fact that an earlier oil spill had occurred in the same area: on 12 May 1976, the supertanker Urquiola scraped the bottom of the channel entrance in A Coruña, causing the ship to spill its cargo of 107,000 tons of oil. This affected sea life as well as subtidal sediments, but the surviving sea life developed defense mechanisms which allowed them to survive such a crisis. The sea life in A Coruña appeared to remain stable until the wreck of the Aegean Sea.

To determine the impact of the spill on sea life, a study was conducted to determine species richness, abundance, and biomass. Scientist analyzed changes from December 1992 to November 1996, and found that the macrobenthic communities living in the coast of the affected areas displayed a similar trend as the original organisms affected by the Urquiola's oil spill. Amphipods seemed to be affected the worst by the oil spill, and experienced a high mortality rate and low abundance rate, up to the spring of 1995. Soon after, the species seemed to recover until the end of the study in 1996. Towards the end of the study, a trend was discovered in which resistant species dominated the ecosystem.

A third oil spill occurred around the same area in A Coruña in November 2002, in which a tanker, Prestige, carrying 77,000 tons of oil split into two and spilled its cargo. About 10,000 tons of oil was spilled but the sunken hull of Prestige is still leaking oil from her tanks to this day.

== See also ==
- List of oil spills
- MV Prestige: another oil tanker that sank off the Galician coast in 2002
