= Elisa & Marcela =

2019 film

- Film poster
- Directed by: Isabel Coixet
- Written by: Isabel Coixet
- Starring: Natalia de Molina; Greta Fernández
- Music by: Sofía Oriana Infante
- Production companies: Movies Production 2017 AIE; Zenit Televisión; Lanube Películas; Rodar y Rodar
- Distributed by: Netflix
- Release dates: 13 February 2019 (Berlinale); 24 May 2019 (Spain)
- Country: Spain
- Language: Spanish

Elisa & Marcela (Spanish: Elisa y Marcela) is a 2019 Spanish biographical romantic drama film directed by Isabel Coixet. Starring Natalia de Molina and Greta Fernández, the plot concerns the story of Elisa Sánchez Loriga and Marcela Gracia Ibeas, two women who posed as a heterosexual couple in order to marry in 1901 at Church of Saint George in A Coruña, becoming the first same-sex matrimony recorded in Spain.

== Plot ==
A young woman travels to the house of Marcela in Chubut Province, Argentina. After a meal, Marcela begins to tell her story from 27 years ago.

The year is 1898. Marcela attends a Catholic school in A Coruña, where she meets Elisa, an older student. The two quickly form a friendship.

The two girls spend a day frolicking on the beach, of which Elisa says it was the happiest day in her life. Marcela's traditional father becomes increasingly suspicious of the two girls' relationships and sends Marcela off to boarding school, in Madrid. The distance does not stand in the way of their relationship, however, and they continue to write letters to one another during their time apart.

Three years later both of them are now teachers at Cuoso, Galicia, where they begin living together. The villagers however become suspicious of the couple and attack Elisa.

They devise an escape plan. Elisa leaves for a few days, and returns dressed as a man, taking the identity of her deceased cousin Mario. In the meantime, Marcela has become impregnated by local woodcutter Andrés.

Marcela and "Mario" are married by the local priest. The villagers begin to see through the bluff and form an angry mob to attack their house.

They escape to Portugal where they work odd jobs to buy the fare to Argentina. They are arrested and Marcela gives birth to a girl, Ana. The Spanish authorities want to extradite them: under Spanish jurisdiction they would face 10–20 years in jail. The sympathetic governor doesn't want to do that and orders the warden to let them go. Marcela refuses to let Ana grow up facing discrimination for having gay parents, so she leaves Ana in the care of the warden and his wife.

Forward 27 years: in Argentina, the young woman we now know as Ana, asks Marcela Was it worth it? Marcela doesn't answer, instead she goes to greet Elisa who has just returned home.

A postscript notes same-sex marriage was legalized in Spain in 2005; but that it remains illegal in many countries of the world; and same-sex relationships are still criminalized in a number of those, some that even punish it with the death penalty.

Elisa and Marcela's marriage was never annulled.

== Cast ==
- Natalia de Molina as Elisa
- Greta Fernández as Marcela
- Sara Casasnovas as Ana
- Tamar Novas as Andrés
- María Pujalte as Marcela's mother
- Francesc Orella as Marcela's father
- Manolo Solo as the Warden
- Lluís Homar as Governor Oporto

== Production ==
The film was produced by Movies Production 2017 AIE, Zenit Televisión, Lanube Películas and Rodar y Rodar.

== Release ==
Elisa & Marcela was selected to compete for the Golden Bear at the 69th Berlin International Film Festival, where it screened on 13 February 2019. It was released on 24 May 2019, in selected theaters in Spain, and on 7 June 2019, by Netflix.

== Critical reception ==
On Rotten Tomatoes, the film has an approval rating of 47% based on reviews from 17 critics, with an average rating of 5.8/10. The website's critics consensus reads: "While it may be visually attractive, Elisa & Marcela is an underwhelming melodrama that lacks passion and energy."

Jay Weissberg from Variety defined it "a dully made, frequently ridiculous eye-roller shot in standard issue black-and-white that gussies itself up as a brave clarion call for gay rights", while Lee Marshall from Screen considered Coixet's work "a conventional and predictably plotted period drama (...) [It] misses no opportunity to make forbidden love look as classy as a perfume ad." Clarence Tsui from The Hollywood Reporter acknowledged that "wanting to make a point, the filmmaker has delivered a piece devoid of the emotional nuances that made Brokeback Mountain or Carol, to cite two seminal same-sex love stories, such gripping and heartbreaking viewing."

== See also ==
- List of Spanish films of 2019
