= María Pita =

Galician heroine

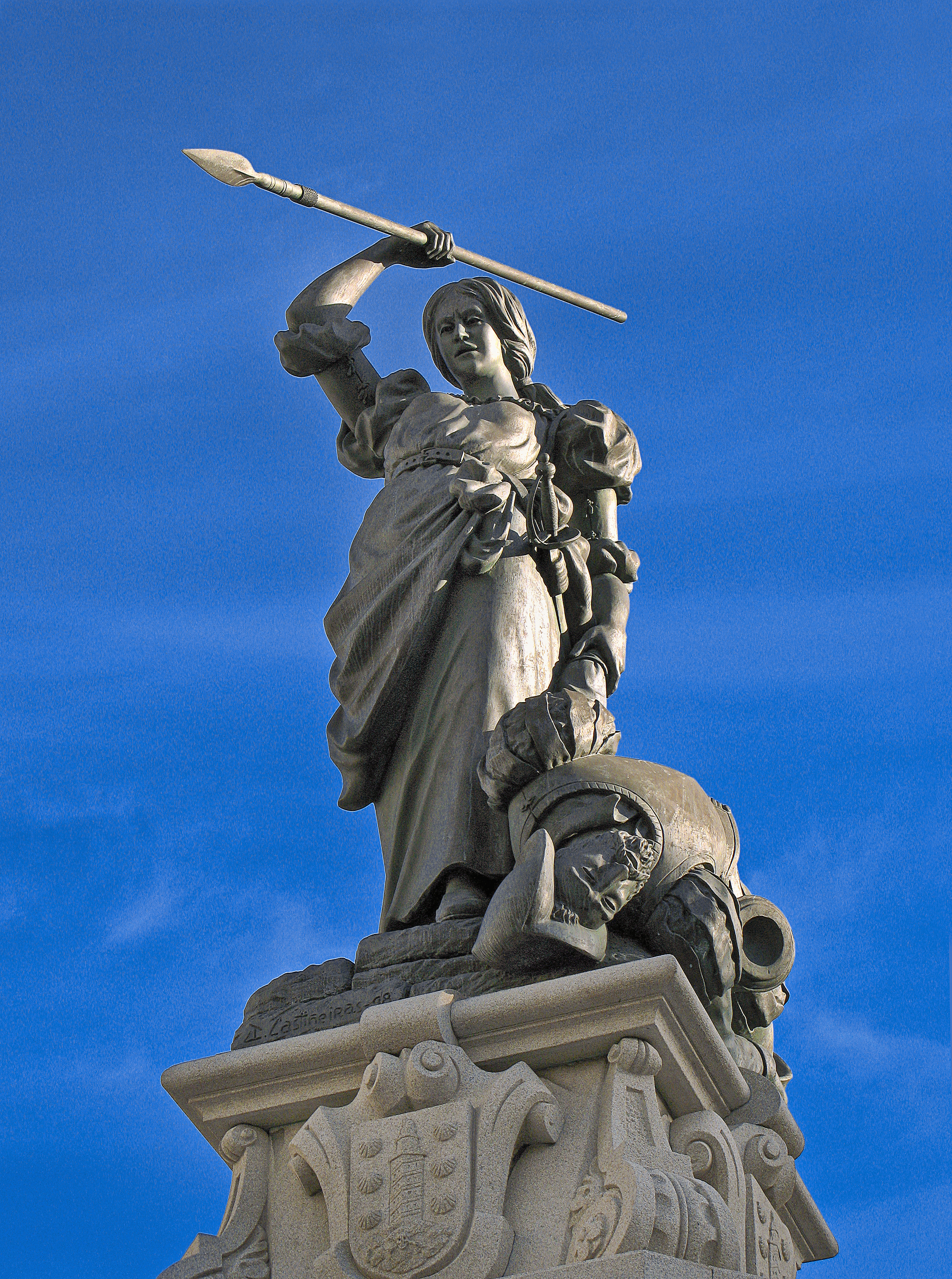
- Monument to María Pita, A Coruña
- Born: María Mayor Fernández de Cámara y Pita; 1565; Santiago de Sigrás, Cambre
- Died: 21 February 1643 (aged 77–78)
- Known for: Heroine in the defense of Coruña, Galicia

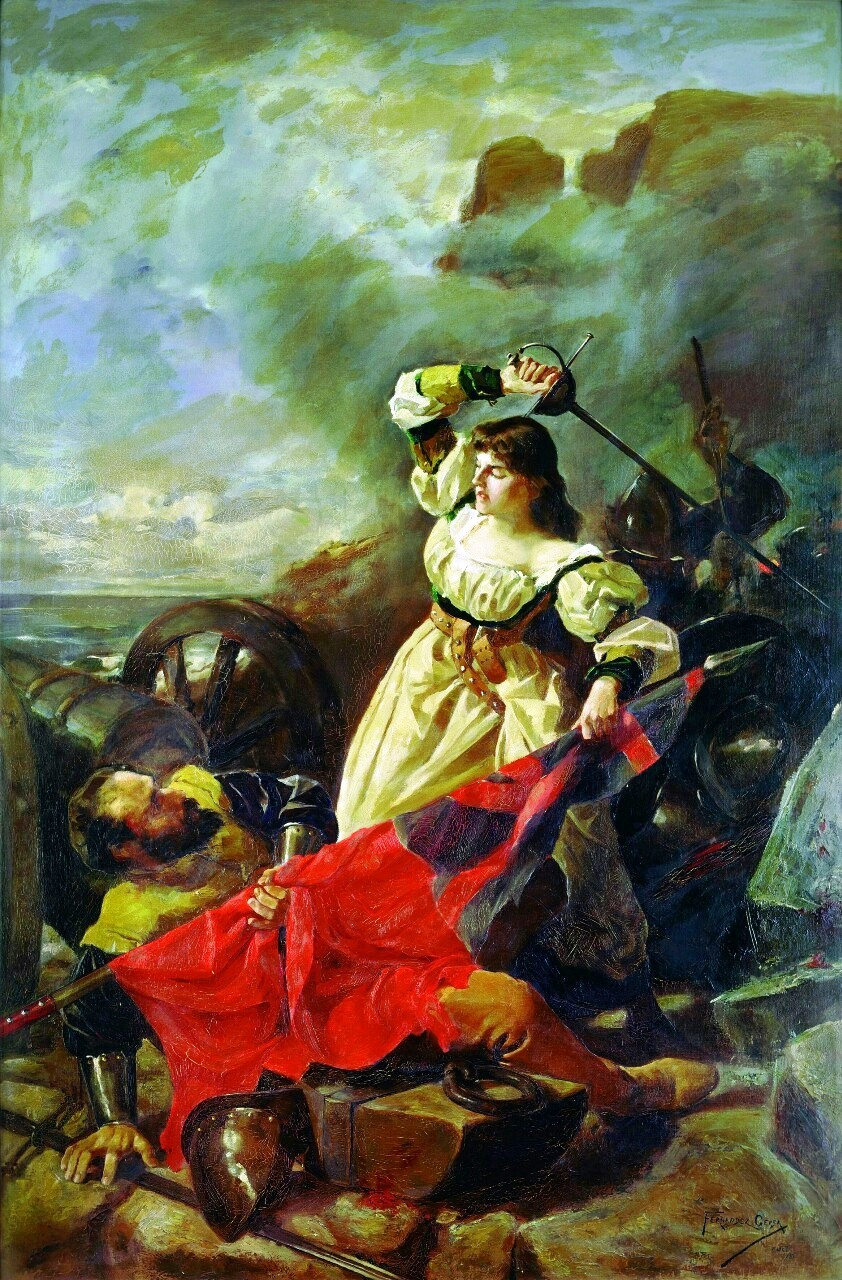
María Pita charging the English, by Arturo Fernández Cersa.

María Mayor Fernández de Cámara y Pita (1565 – 21 February 1643), known as María Pita, was a heroine in the defense of A Coruña, Galicia (northern Spain), against the English Armada attack, an English attack upon the Spanish mainland in 1589. She was born in Sigrás, a village in Cambre, Spain.

== Early life ==
Born to Simón Arnao and María Pita circa 1556–1565, she dedicated her early life to working her own business in Peixería da Coruña.

== Defense of Coruña ==
On 4 May 1589, English forces, already in control of the lower city, breached the defenses of the old city. María Pita was assisting her husband, an army captain manning the defenses. After her husband fell mortally wounded, Pita, full of rage, snatched the spear carrying the banner from an English captain and killed him with it. The man was allegedly the brother of Admiral Francis Drake. This demoralized the English troops, composed of 12.000 men, who began to retreat. María Pita then appeared on the heights of the wall herself, shouting in Galician: Quen teña honra, que me siga ("Whoever has honour, follow me!") whereupon the English incursion was driven back by the defenders. The English later abandoned the siege and withdrew to their ships. Other women also participated directly in the defense of Coruña; a surviving record tells of one Inés de Ben receiving treatment for two shots received in the siege. Pita's heroic deeds were honoured and rewarded by Philip II, who granted her the pension of a military officer, which she received following the death of her husband who was killed during the battle.

== Personal life ==
María Pita was married four times and had four children. Her first husband was Xoán de Rois, a butcher. They were married from 1581 until his death in 1585. Her second marriage was to Gregorio de Rocamonde, also a butcher, who was killed during the Siege of Coruña in 1589. Her third husband was an Andalusian shipmaster named Sancho de Arratia. They were married from 1590 to 1592. Her fourth and final husband was Gil Bermúdez de Figueroa, a squire of the royal court, who died in 1613. Her four children were María Alonso de Rois, Francisca de Arratia, Juan Bermúdez de Figueroa and Francisco Bermúdez de Figueroa.

== Other ==
Her city honors her with a 3.30-meter-tall (10.8 ft) statue (more than 9 meters including pedestal).

== Spanish ships ==
- The ship María Pita of the Balmis Expedition was named after her in 1803.
- In August 2008, SASEMAR (Sociedad de Salvamento y Seguridad Marítima, Spanish acronym for Sea Rescue and Safety Society) baptized the BS-14 Rescue Ship as María Pita.

== See also ==
- The Siege of Coruña
