= Igrexa de San Xurxo (A Coruña) =

Church in A Coruña, Spain

Coordinates: 43.3716°N 8.3969°W

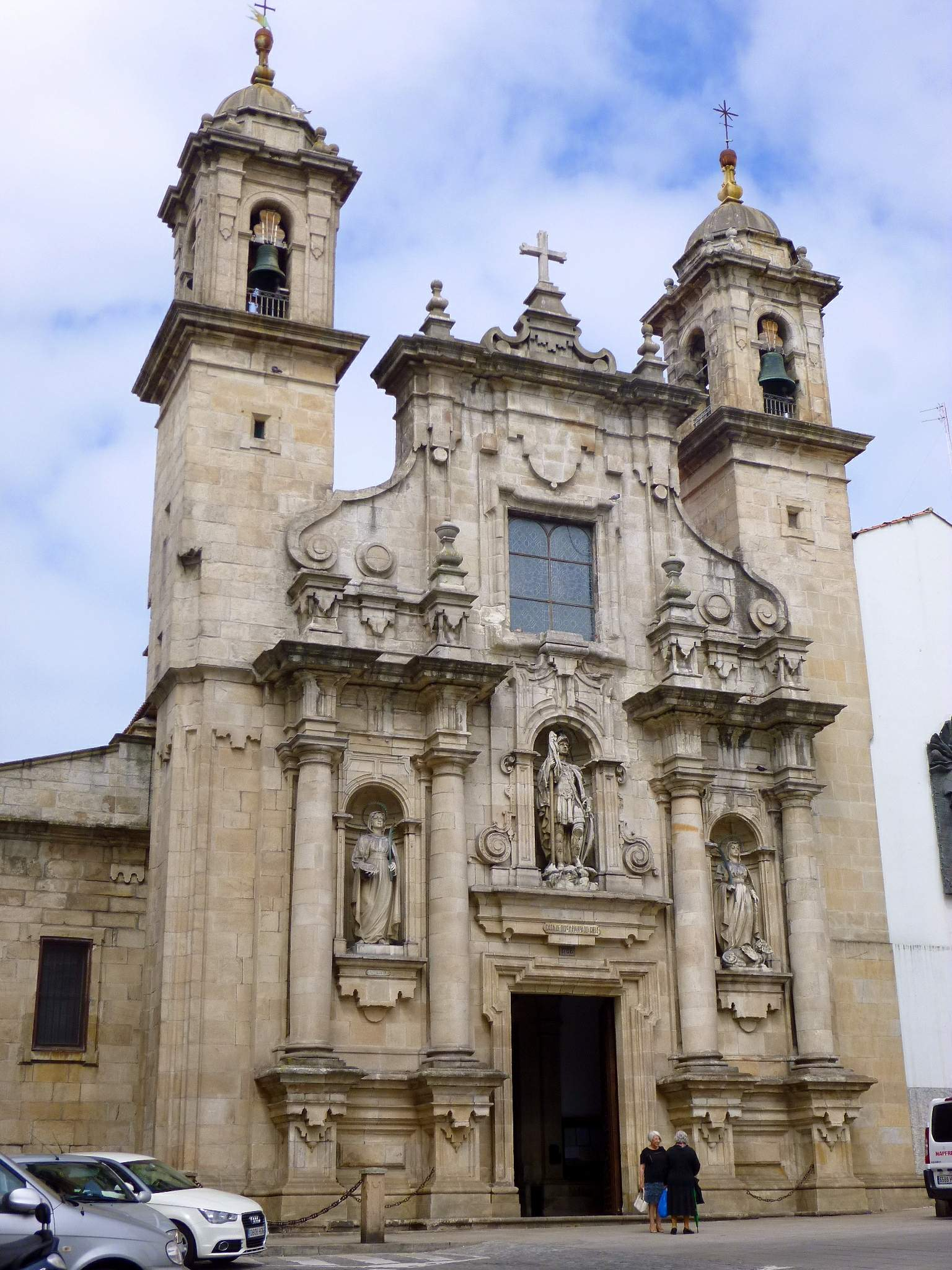
Main façade

Igrexa de San Xurxo (English: Church of Saint George) is a church in A Coruña, Province of A Coruña, Galicia, Spain. It is built in the baroque style.

Here first same-sex marriage in Spain took place between Elisa and Marcela in 1901, which is the basis for the movie of the same name
