= First same-sex marriage in Spain =

First recorded same-sex marriage in Spain

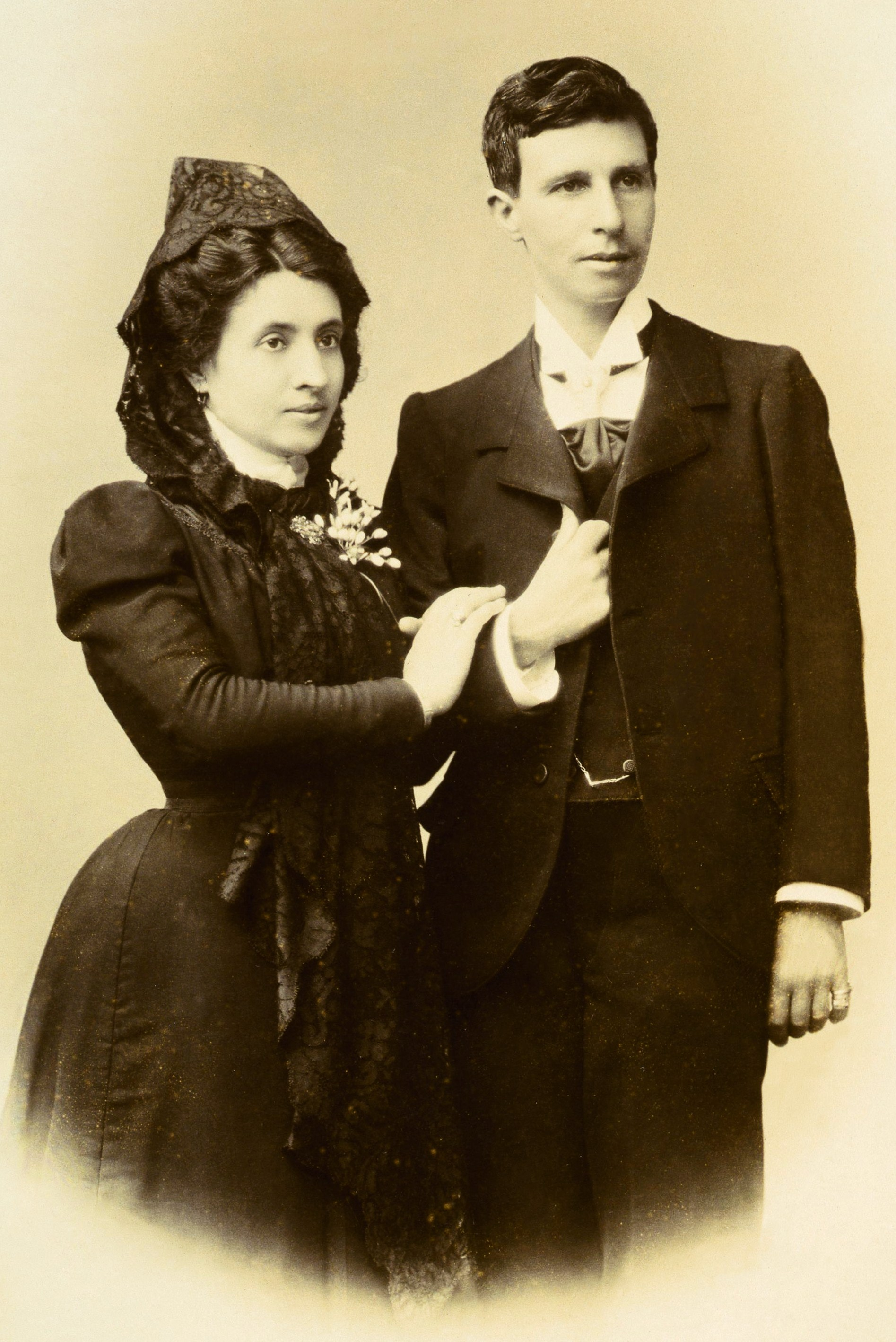
Marcela and Elisa after the wedding.

The first same-sex marriage in Spain occurred on 8 June 1901. Two women, Marcela Gracia Ibeas and Elisa Sánchez Loriga, attempted to get married in A Coruña (Galicia, Spain). To achieve it Elisa had to present masculine and adopt a masculine name: Mario Sánchez, as listed on the marriage certificate. It is the first attempt at same-sex marriage in Spain for which there is recorded evidence. It was performed by the Catholic Church, in the parish church of Saint George of the same city. The marriage certificate was never annulled.

Their matrimonial union took place more than 100 years before same-sex couples were permitted to be married in Spain. The two worked as teachers at a time when the vast majority of the Galician population was illiterate. This event could be considered a precedent for same-sex marriage in Spain. News of their wedding was spread to all Spain and to various European countries. The couple escaped to Argentina.

== First encounter, separation and reunion ==
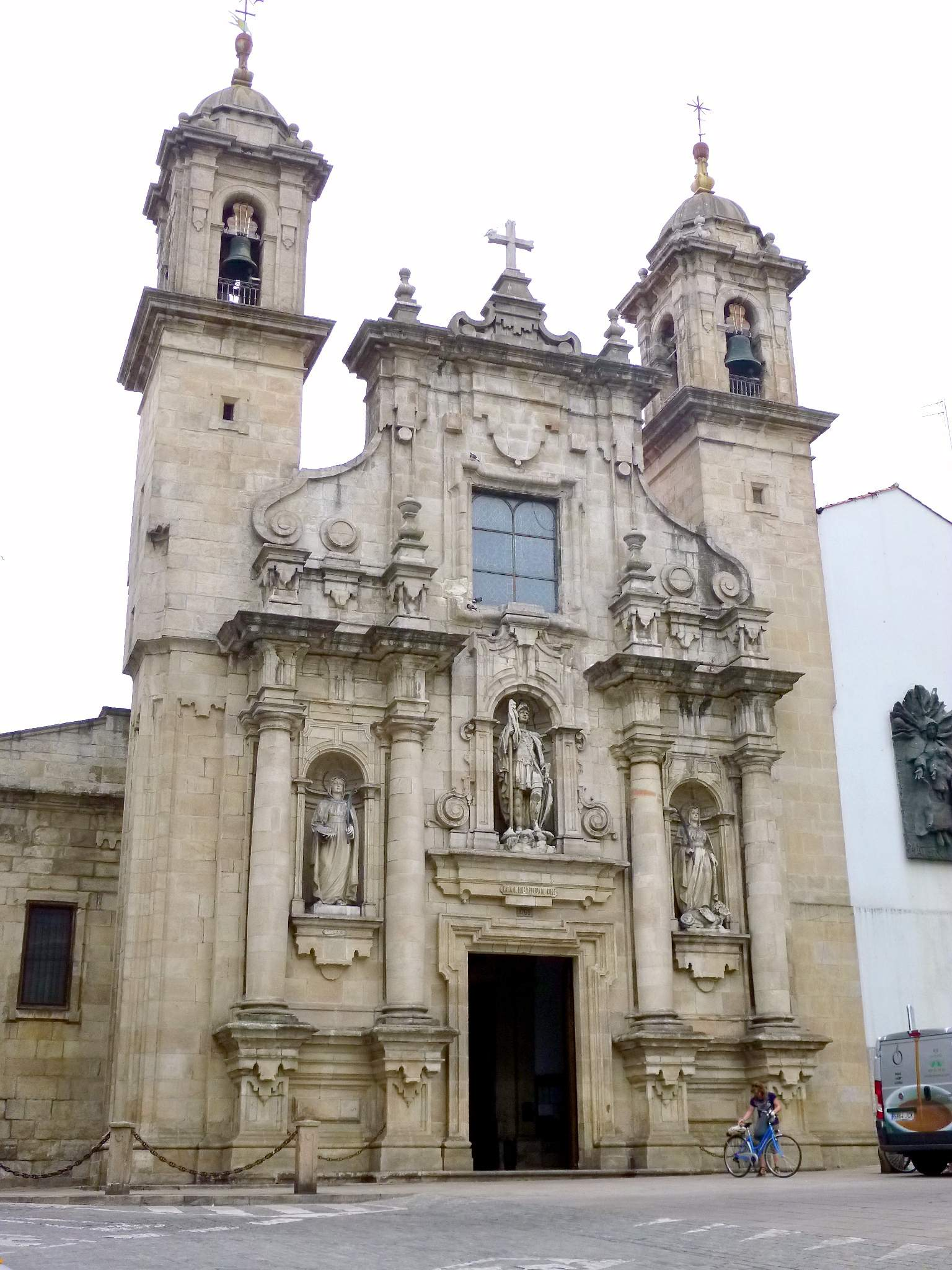
Church of Saint George (Igrexa de San Xurxo), in A Coruña, where Elisa and Marcela got married.

Marcela and Elisa met while studying in the Teacher-Training College for Teachers in A Coruña, where the future teachers of elementary education were educated. Their friendship gave way to a more intimate relationship. Marcela's parents, seeing that the friendship was growing beyond what was socially permitted and fearing a possible scandal, sent their daughter to Madrid. Time went by and both, one in A Coruña and the other in Madrid, finished their studies. They were reunited again when Elisa was appointed as a temporary teacher at Couso, a small parish of Coristanco in A Coruña. Nearby, in Vimianzo, in the village of Calo, Marcela established herself already as a superior teacher. As a consequence of the same, they decided to live together in Calo, where Elisa worked. In 1889, Marcela had to go to teach classes at Dumbría while Elisa remained in Calo, but they stayed in contact until Elisa moved to the town where Marcela lived.

== False identity and marriage ==
In 1901, Elisa adopted a masculine appearance (with which she appeared in the Teaching College to apply for a certificate of study), fabricated a past, and was transformed into Mario. For this invented past, she took as reference a cousin of hers killed in a shipwreck. Furthermore, she made up that she had passed her childhood in London and that her father was an atheist. Considering this last circumstance, Father Víctor Cortiella, parish priest of San Jorge, baptized Mario on 26 May 1901 (furthermore, he received first communion), and subsequently married the couple on 8 June 1901 after the publication of the banns. The marriage ceremony was short; the sponsors bore witness to its validity; and the couple passed the night of the wedding in the boarding house Corcubión, on the street of San Andrés.

=== Consequences ===
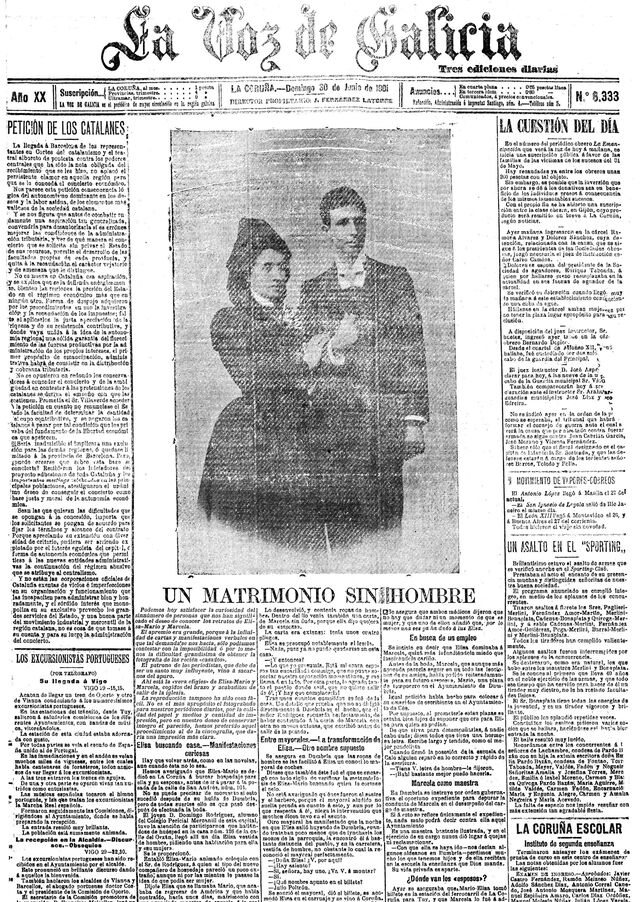
La Voz de Galicia, 1901-06-30.

Finally, the neighbours could not remain indifferent as before, with what was at the moment known as "a marriage without a man". The couple were exposed by Galician and Madrid newspapers and, as a consequence of this, both quickly lost their jobs, were excommunicated, and were issued an arrest warrant. It appears that, so that the excommunication could take place, the parish priest requested a doctor examine Mario to check if he was a man or a woman. Mario agreed. When the doctor issued his verdict, Mario attempted to pass for a hermaphrodite whose condition had been diagnosed in London. The Civil Guard pursued the couple to the town of Dumbrías, where they both worked as teachers. There is evidence that they passed for Vigo and Oporto in their escape. The last that is known of them is that they managed to board a ship destined for South America (possibly Argentina, as so many other Spaniards of the era), where they spent their honeymoon and, finally, stayed to live. One of the cases that one of the courts took against them was closed. Several years later, some residents of Dumbría spread a rumour about the death of Elisa and the subsequent marriage of Marcela to a man. This rumour has not been confirmed.

The wedding, according to the Diocesan Archive, is still valid, as neither the Church nor the civil registry annulled the marriage certificates, so this is the first recorded same-sex marriage in Spain.

On 18 December 2008, the book Elisa e Marcela – Alén dos homes (Elisa and Marcela – Beyond men), by Narciso de Gabriel, was published in A Coruña. The 300-page book, written in Galician, tells the story of the two women from the time they fled Coruña in 1901 until 1904. It narrates the events in Porto, Portugal, where they were imprisoned, tried, and later released. They fled to Argentina after the Spanish government demanded their extradition from Portugal.

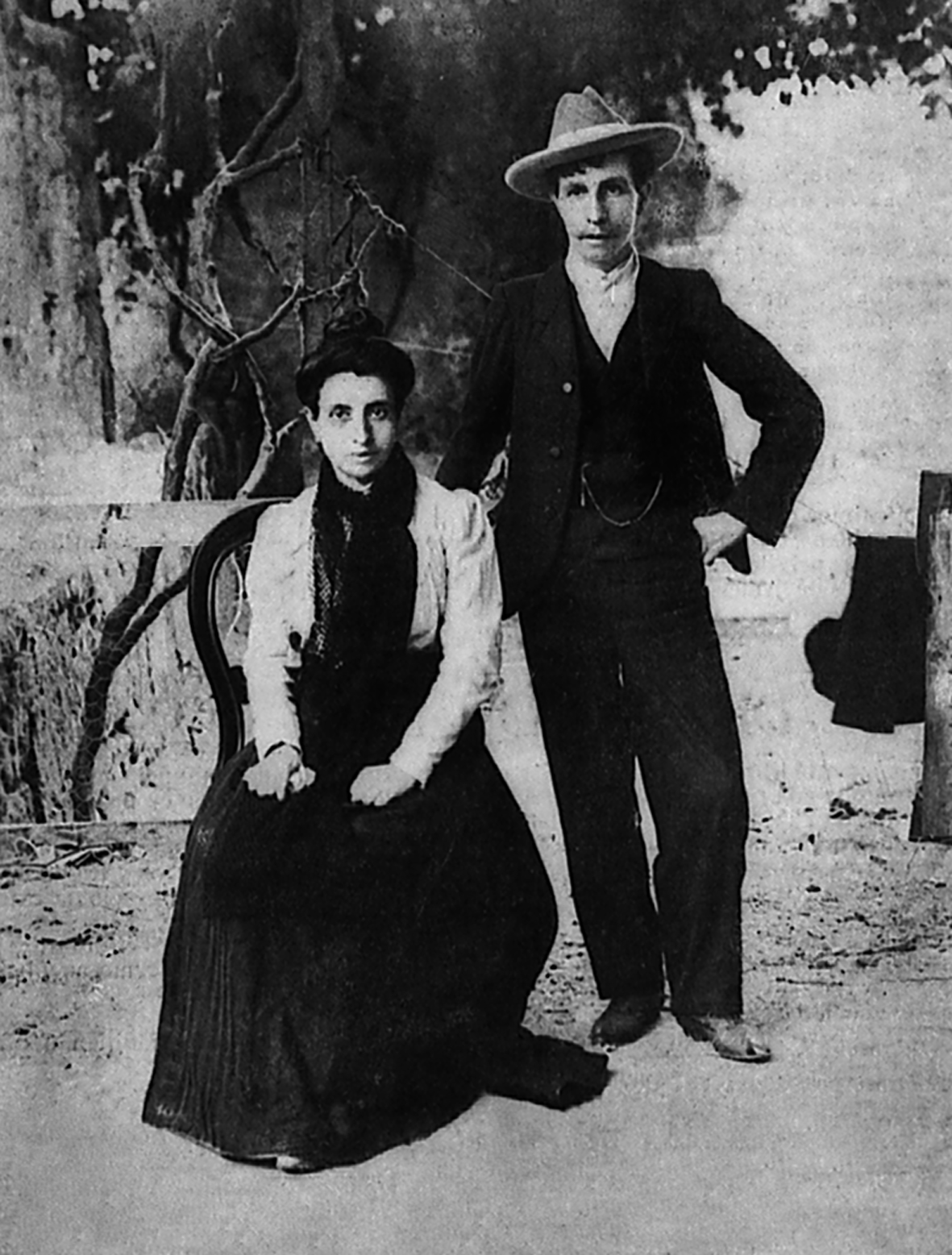
Marcela Gracia Ibeas and Elisa Sánchez Loriga after their arrest in Portugal

Before leaving Porto for the Americas, Marcela gave birth to a girl. After they landed in Buenos Aires, Elisa (under the alias of Maria) married Christian Jensen, a wealthy immigrant from Denmark 24 years her senior, in 1903. Marcela, under the alias of Carmen, stayed there with her sister and her daughter.

Elisa refused to consummate the marriage with Jensen. He grew suspicious and tried to have the marriage annulled on the grounds that Elisa wasn't, in fact, a woman. This claim was never substantiated: Three medical examinations confirmed that Elisa was a woman. Since the marriage was between a man and a woman, and therefore valid, no charges were brought against Elisa. After this time, there is no further record of Marcela and Elisa.

== Social and legal impact ==
In current media the courage of these two women is emphasized, stressing that they went into history as the first gay marriage in Spain. Isaías Lafuente (editor in chief of Cadena SER), in his book Agrupémonos todas, looks at the highlights of feminism in the twentieth century and indicates the story of Marcela and Elisa as one of the most significant events related to the movement occurring in Galicia (another is the figure of Emilia Pardo Bazán).

The group Milhomes founded the Marcela and Elisa Award, which, with the help of the FELGTB, is already in its sixth edition. They also claim a long street with their name in A Coruña, with little success so far.

In 1902 the book La sed de amar, by the Extremaduran writer Felipe Trigo, was published in Spain. This was a book of great impact in that period. It includes the story of Marcela and Elisa, using the names of Rosa and Claudia, respectively. The profile of these two women and the story of their relationship is transcribed to the fiction of the book with almost total equivalence to the real story. Felipe Trigo's own footnotes in one edition of the book state that the story is real and happened in A Coruña in 1901.

== First documented marriage between people of the same sex in 1061 ==
Nowadays this event is considered one of the oldest precursors to same-sex marriage between two consenting people of the same gender in Spain. However, it may not actually have been the first. In the Middle Ages, a same-sex marriage between the two men Pedro Díaz and Muño Vandilaz in the Galician municipality of Rairiz de Veiga was recorded on 16 April 1061. The historic documents about the church wedding were found at Monastery of San Salvador de Celanova in Celanova, Ourense, from where they were transferred to the National Historical Archive of Madrid. It is not known whether the priest was aware of the gender of both.

== 2005 legislation ==
Same-sex marriage was legalized in Spain in 2005, by law 13/2005. The first same-sex marriage under that law took place on 11 July of that year, in Tres Cantos, Madrid, between Emilio Menéndez and Carlos Baturín, who had lived as a couple for more than thirty years. The first marriage of two women under the law was 11 days later, in Barcelona.

== Representation in film ==
The story of Marcela Gracia Ibeas and Elisa Sánchez Loriga was the basis of the 2019 film Elisa & Marcela, directed by Isabel Coixet.

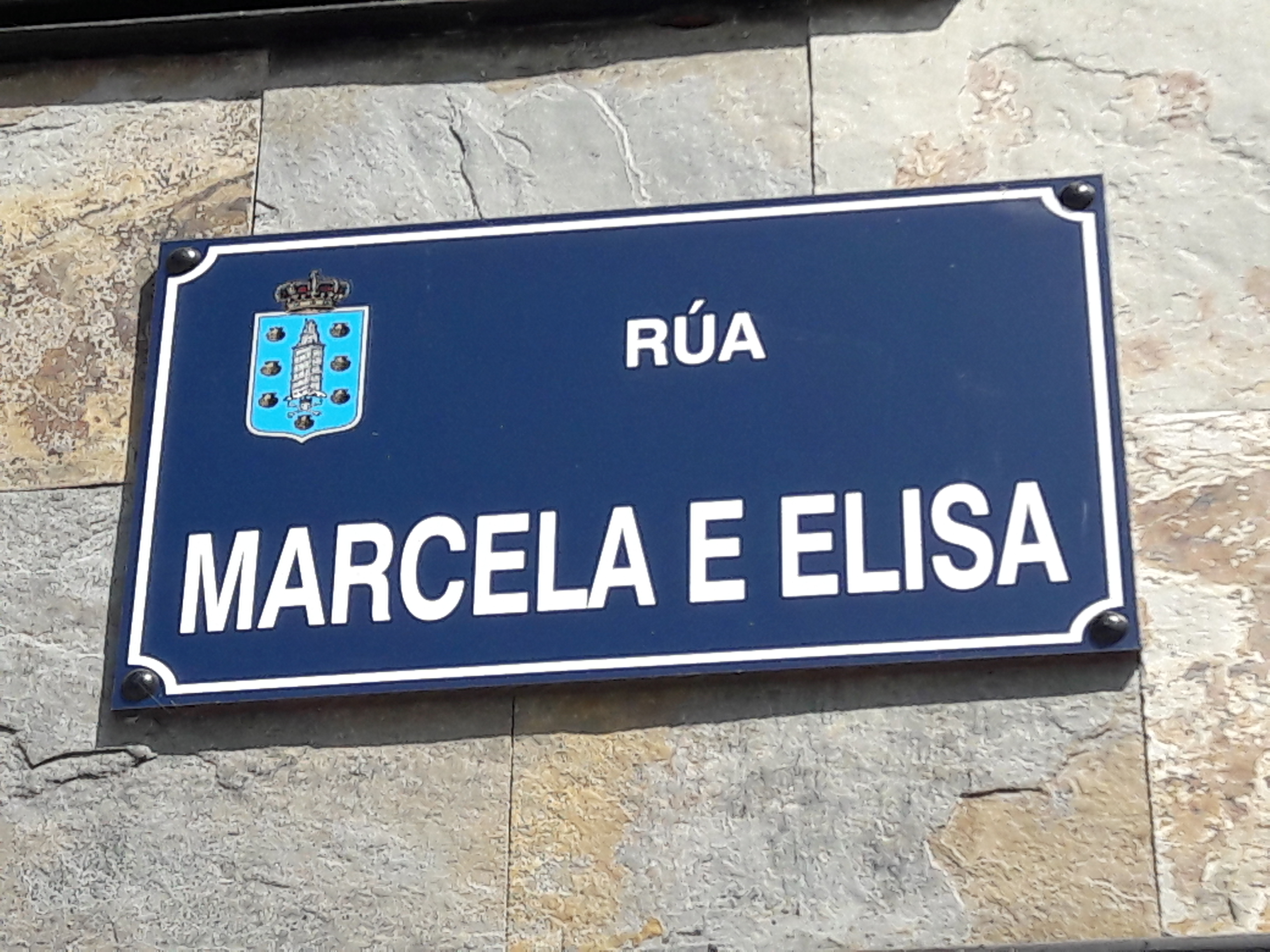
Rúa Marcela e Elisa.

== Today ==
In 2020, an Argentine lady, Norma Graciela Moure, discovered she is the great-granddaughter of Marcela who went by the name Marcela Carmen Garcia in Argentina. It is thought that Elisa committed suicide in Veracruz in 1909, however, this has not been confirmed.

== See also ==
- Timeline of same-sex marriage
- Same-sex marriage in Spain
- LGBT rights in Spain
