= Tower of Hercules =

Roman lighthouse

- Torre de Hércules, Faro Bregancio (Galician); Torre de Hercules (Spanish)
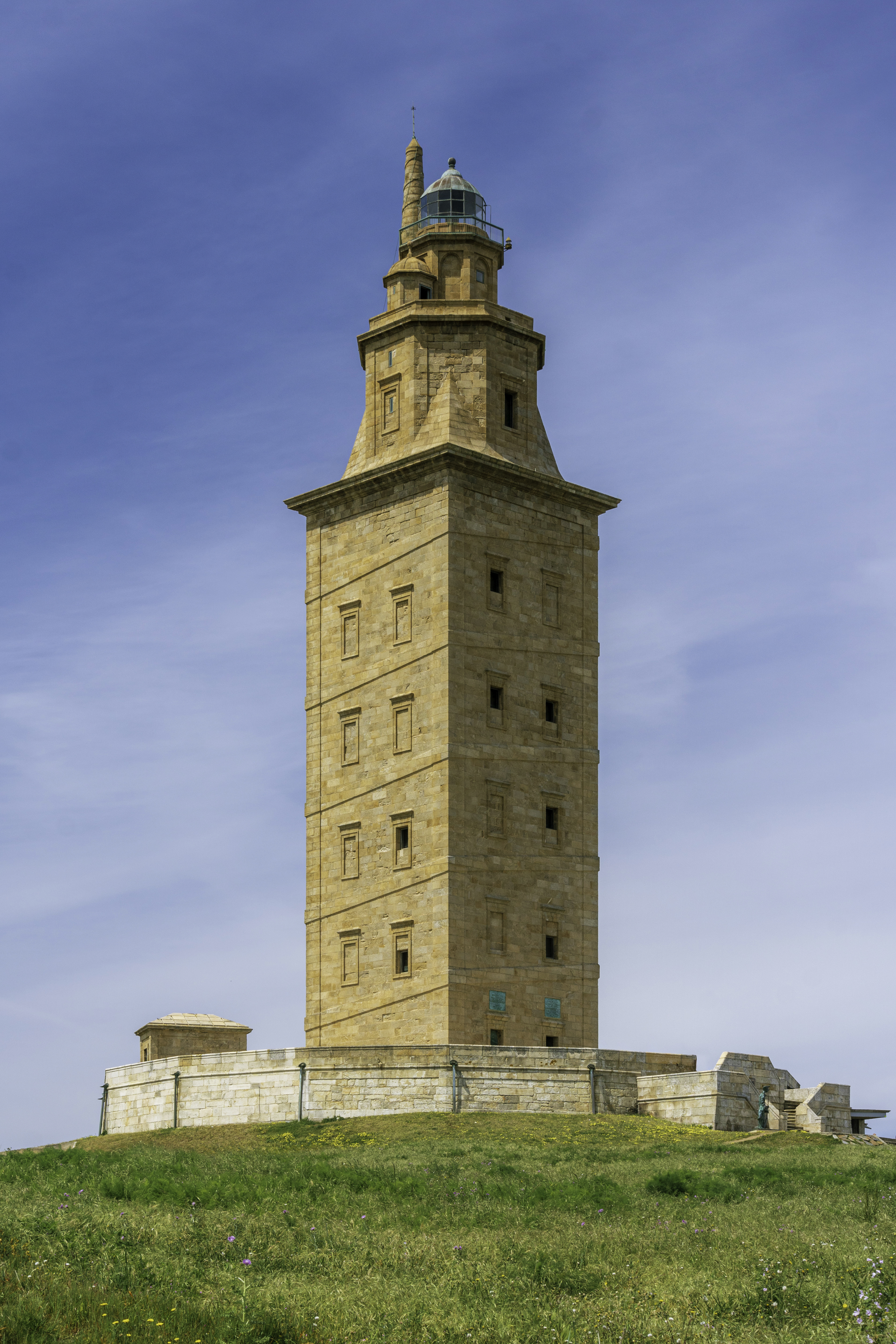
- View from the south-east in 2023.

- Site of the Tower of Hercules in Galicia Tower of Hercules (Spain)
- 43°23′9″N 8°24′23″W
- Location: A Coruña, Galicia, Spain

History
- Built: 1st century AD

Site notes
- Elevation: 57 metres (187 ft)
- Governing body: Ministry of Culture
- Visitors: 149,440 (in 2009)

UNESCO World Heritage Site
- Official name: Tower of Hercules
- Type: Cultural
- Criteria: iii
- Designated: 2009 (33rd session)
- Reference no.: 1312
- Region: Europe and North America

Spanish Cultural Heritage
- Official name: Torre de Hércules
- Type: Royal property
- Criteria: Monument
- Designated: 3 June 1931
- Reference no.: (R.I.) - 51 - 0000540 - 00000

The Tower of Hercules (Galician: Torre de Hércules, Spanish: Torre de Hércules) is an ancient Roman lighthouse in A Coruña, Galicia, Spain, overlooking the Atlantic coast. It is the only fully preserved Roman lighthouse still used for maritime signalling. Built in the late 1st century, the tower is located on a peninsula about 2.4 km (1.5 mi) from the centre of A Coruña, Galicia, in northwestern Spain. Until the 20th century, it was known as the Farum Brigantium. The Latin word farum is derived from the Greek Φάρος, Pharos, for the Lighthouse of Alexandria in Egypt. The tower was renovated in the 18th century and stands 55 metres (180 ft) tall, comprising 34 metres (112 ft) of surviving Roman masonry and 21 metres (69 ft) added during the restoration.

There is a sculpture garden on the grounds of the lighthouse featuring works by Pablo Serrano and Francisco Leiro. The Tower of Hercules is a National Monument of Spain and has been a UNESCO World Heritage Site since 27 June 2009. It is the second-tallest lighthouse in Spain, after the Faro de Chipiona.

== Construction and history ==
Cornerstone with name of the ancient Roman architect

The tower is known to have existed by the 1st century. It was built (or perhaps rebuilt) by the Emperor Trajan, possibly on foundations following a design that was Phoenician in origin. The design was based on the original plans of the Lighthouse of Alexandria. Its base preserves a cornerstone with the inscription MARTI AVG.SACR C.SEVIVS LVPVS ARCHITECTVS ÆMINIENSIS LVSITANVS.EX.VO, ascribing the tower's design to the architect Gaius Sevius Lupus, from Aeminium (present-day Coimbra, Portugal) in the former province of Lusitania, as an offering to the Roman god of war, Mars. The original tower was shorter and wider than the current tower, as the surviving core was surrounded by a spiral ramp. The outline of this ramp is still visible in the restored exterior. The final storey of the tower was probably topped with a dome.

The earliest known reference to the lighthouse at Brigantium is by Paulus Orosius in Historiae adversum Paganos, written around 415–417:

Secundus angulus circium intendit, ubi Brigantia Gallaeciae civitas sita altissimum farum et inter pauca memorandi operis ad speculam Britanniae erigit
("At the second angle of the circuit circumnavigating Hispania, where the Gallaecian city of Brigantia is sited, a very tall lighthouse is erected among a few commemorative works, for looking towards Britannia.")

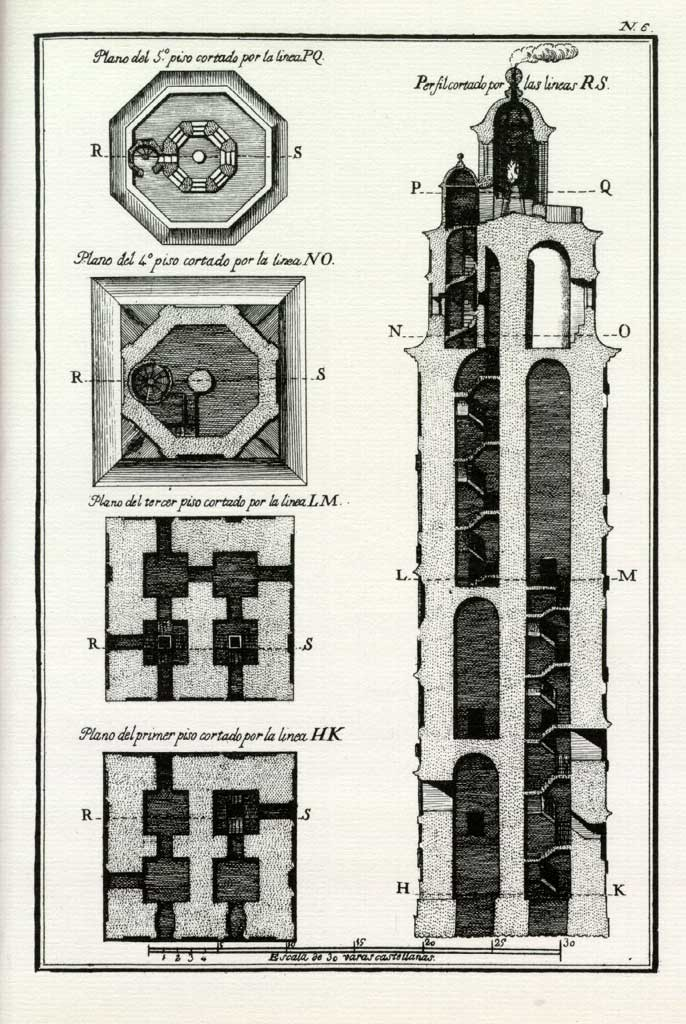
Plan and elevation, from Joseph Cornide, Investigaciones sobre la fundación y fábrica de la torre llamada de Hércules, 1792

In the 18th century, the surviving 34-metre (112 ft) tower core was restored, including the construction of a new 21-metre (69 ft) fourth storey. The restoration was undertaken by naval engineer Eustaquio Giannini. UNESCO has labelled this restoration as "exemplary", praising the protection of the central core of the original Roman monument alongside its restoration to working condition. Within, the much-repaired Roman and medieval masonry remains visible.

The Romans who conquered this region of Spain believed it to be, in a figurative sense, the end of the Earth – hence its name, Finisterra. This region is notorious for shipwrecks, earning it the name Costa da Morte, "Coast of Death".

== Myths ==
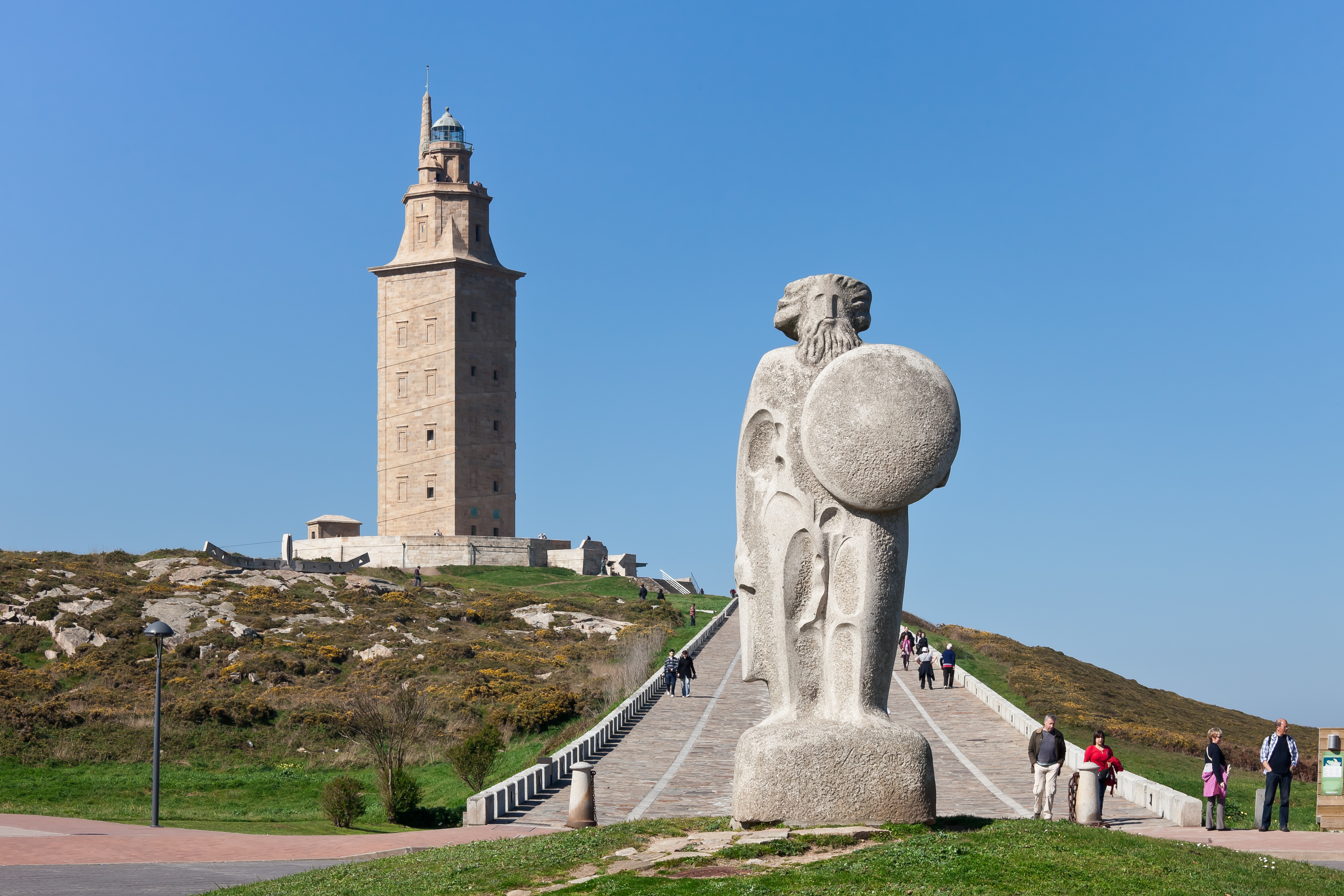
Breogán and the Tower of Hercules

Through the millennia, many mythical stories of the lighthouse's origin have been told. According to a myth that mixes Celtic and Greco-Roman elements, the hero Hercules slew the giant tyrant Geryon after three days and three nights of continuous battle. Hercules then, in a traditional Celtic gesture, buried the head of Geryon with his weapons and ordered that a city be built on the site. The lighthouse, standing atop a skull and crossbones representing the buried head of Hercules' slain enemy, appears in the coat of arms of the city of A Coruña.

According to another legend from the 11th-century Irish compilation Lebor Gabála Érenn—the "Book of Invasions"—King Breogán, the founding father of the Galician Celtic nation, constructed a massive tower of such a grand height that his sons could see a distant green shore from its top. The glimpse of that distant green land lured them to sail north to Ireland. According to the legend, Breogán's descendants stayed in Ireland and are the Celtic ancestors of the current Irish people. A colossal statue of Breogán has been erected near the Tower.

Throughout the Middle Ages, multiple naval crusading itineraries to the Holy Land mentioned the obligatory stopover at the lighthouse. Usually, the crusader fleets would disembark there to reach the shrine of the Apostle James the Greater at Santiago de Compostela on foot. De expugnatione Lyxbonensi and De itinere Frisonum helped to perpetuate the legend that the lighthouse had been built by Julius Caesar perhaps due to a misreading of the ancient inscription.

== Possible locations of Brigantia ==
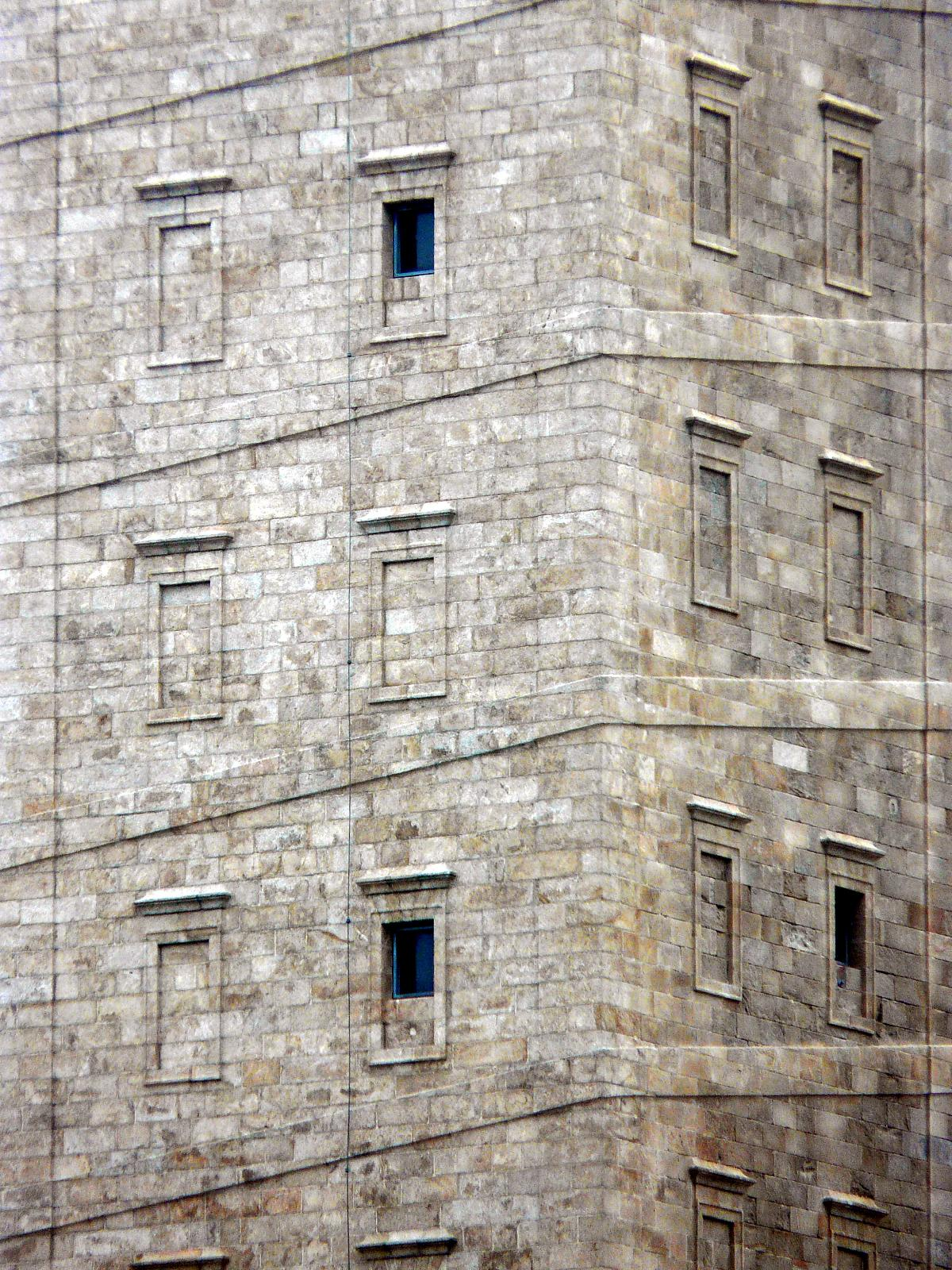
Close-up of wall and spiral that once supported a ramp

Early geographical descriptions of Brigantia point out that the town's location could either be A Coruña or alternatively some 26 kilometres away, where the town of Betanzos now sits. The people of Betanzos claim it as a fact that Betanzos is "the former city of Brigancia" until the 17th century, both in literary accounts as well as in maps, and they also believe that the name Betanzos is a phonetic evolution from Brigantium > Breganzo > Betanzos. The proponents of the A Coruña tradition and others suggest, however, that this is a false etymology.

The Betanzos tradition claims that the port of Betanzos was getting too small for the larger medieval ships and that king Alfonso IX of León decided to create a bigger port nearby in the 13th century. The place he chose was an uninhabited place called Clunia, which later on evolved to Cruña and eventually Coruña. The place name Clunia is believed to come from the Proto-Celtic root *klou̯ni (cf. Old Irish cluain), meaning meadow.

However, the A Coruña tradition maintains that the "port" of Betanzos (which is a fluvial one on a relatively small river) was far too small for Roman warships to dock at; Julius Caesar, for example, is said to have visited this area with "more than a hundred triremes". A Coruña was an important Roman site, as graveyards and other Roman remains have been found in the city centre, demonstrating that the site was inhabited in the Roman period and was deserted only during the early Middle Ages due to Viking attacks, when its people moved inland to O Burgo (now Culleredo). The proponents of A Coruña as Brigantia also explain the different name as a change that occurred in the Middle Ages and point out that the lighthouse, which was called "Pharum Brigantium", was erected in A Coruña, and is at least 25 km (15 miles) (or a day's walk) from Betanzos.

== Gallery ==
The Tower in the coat of arms of A Coruña

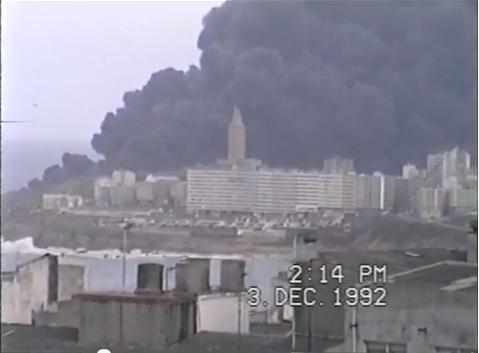
Oil tanker Aegean Sea burning behind the Tower in 1992

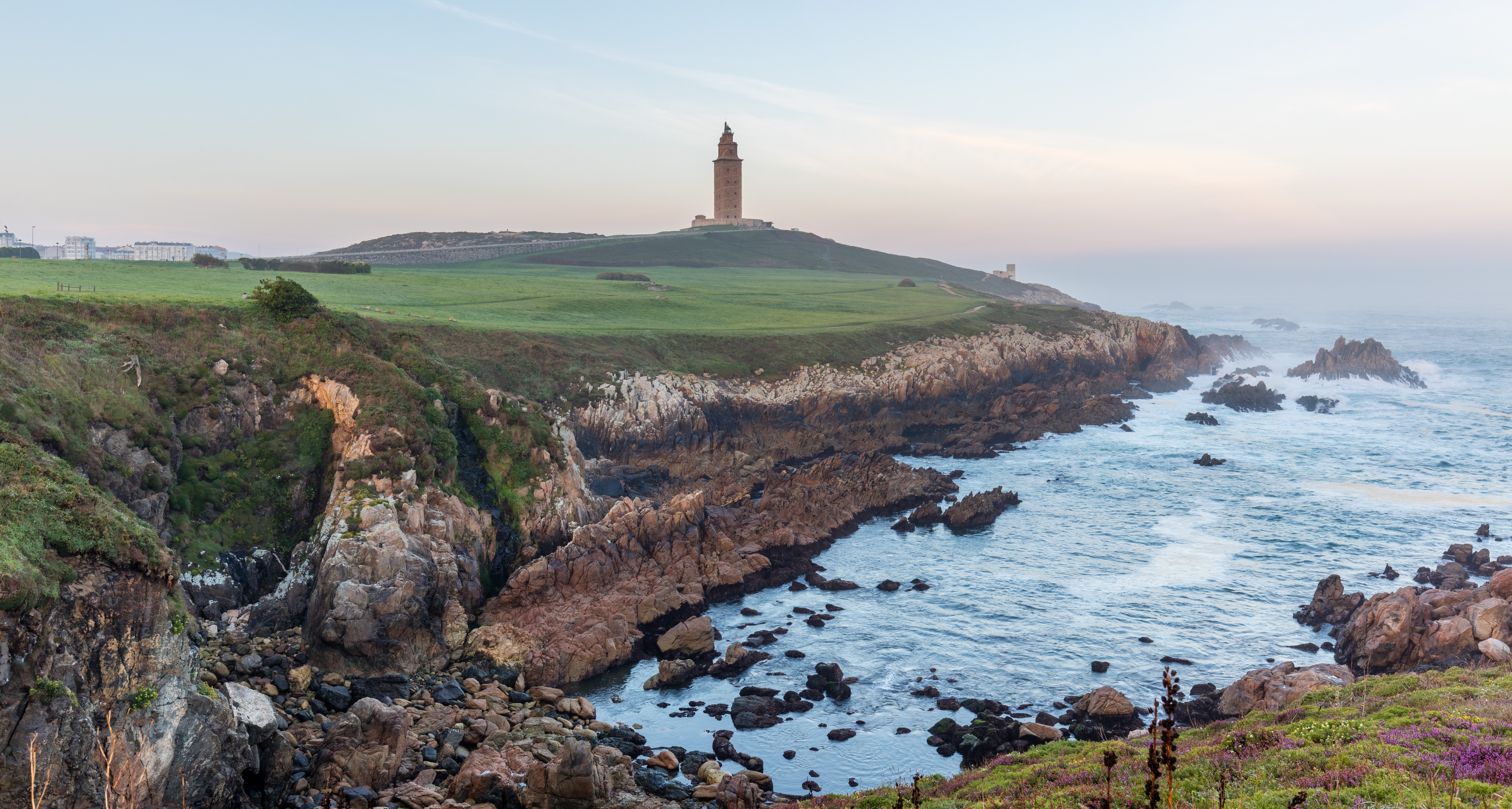
View of the Tower and its surroundings

== See also ==
- Roman architecture
- Roman engineering
- Roman technology
- List of Roman sites in Spain
- List of World Heritage Sites in Spain
- List of lighthouses in Spain
