= Andrea Maffei (architect) =

Italian architect (born 1968)

Andrea Maffei is an Italian architect, born in Modena in 1968. He studied architecture and engineering at the University of Florence and graduated cum laude in 1994. He was an associate director for the projects based in Italy by Arata Isozaki. Among these projects was the new exit for the Uffizi Gallery in Florence, which won first place in an international design competition launched in 1998. In 2005 he founded his own architecture firm Andrea Maffei Architects, with headquarters in the Brera district of Milan, Italy. Together with Arata Isozaki, Maffei co-designed the New Town Library in Maranello, which was opened to the public in 2012; the CityLife office tower in Milan (currently under construction and due to become, with its height of 207 meters, the tallest skyscraper in Italy); and the expansion of the Bologna Centrale railway station, completed in 2016. Maffei was also the project architect for the Palasport Olimpico, designed by Arata Isozaki & Associates and built for the 2006 Winter Olympics in Turin.

== Publications by Andrea Maffei ==
Andrea Maffei (ed.), Toyo Ito: Works Projects Writing, Phaidon Press (2006).
