= Art Tower Mito =

Arts complex in Mito, Ibaraki, Japan

Art Tower Mito 水戸芸術館
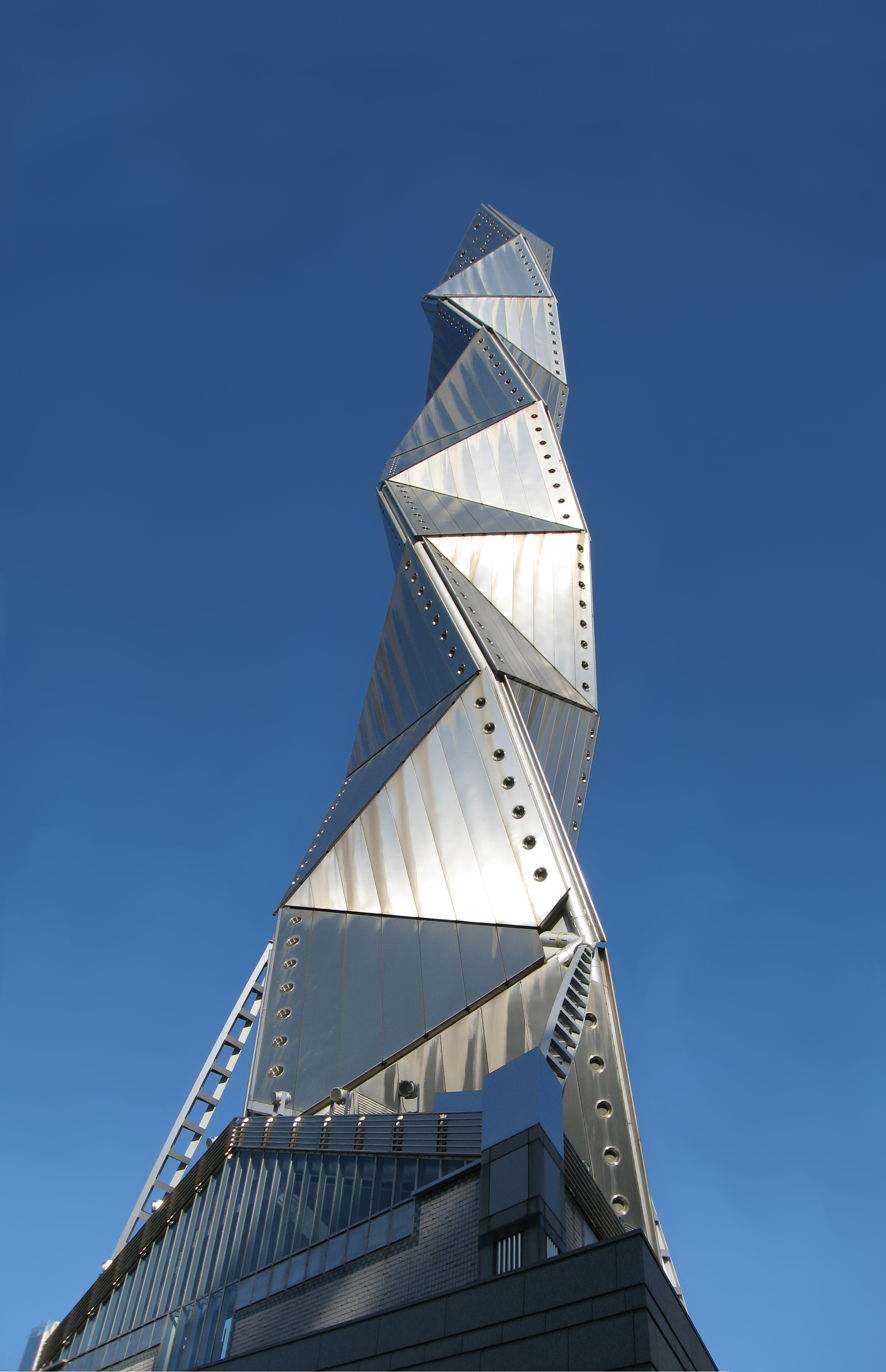
- Interactive map of the Art Tower Mito 水戸芸術館 area

General information
- Location: 1-6-8 Goken-chō, Mito, Ibaraki, Japan
- Coordinates: 36°22′49″N 140°27′57″E
- Opened: March 1990
- Cost: ¥ 9,711 million
- Owner: Mito City

Technical details
- Floor area: 22,432 m^{2}

Design and construction
- Architect: Arata Isozaki
- Other designers: Nagata Acoustics

Website
- www.arttowermito.or.jp/english

References
- Factsheet

Art Tower Mito (水戸芸術館, Mito Geijutsukan) is an arts complex in Mito, Ibaraki, Japan. It opened in 1990 as part of the centennial celebrations of the municipality of Mito. There is a concert hall that seats 680, a theater for up to 636, a contemporary art gallery, and a landmark tower, which rises 100 meters. Arata Isozaki was the architect, with acoustical design by Nagata Acoustics. The design is based on the Boerdijk–Coxeter helix.

== See also ==
- Kairakuen
- Nara Centennial Hall
