= Harbin Concert Hall =

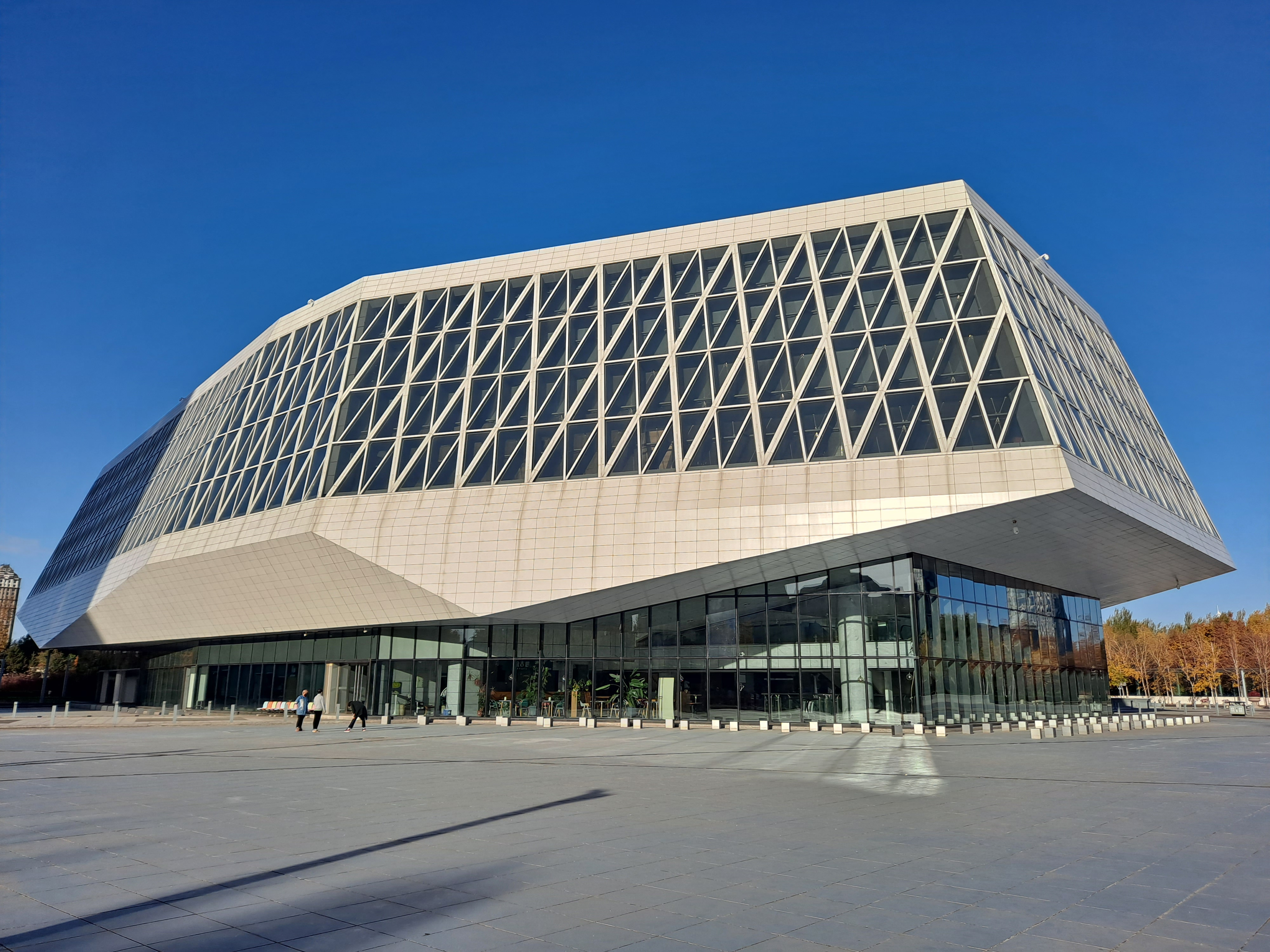
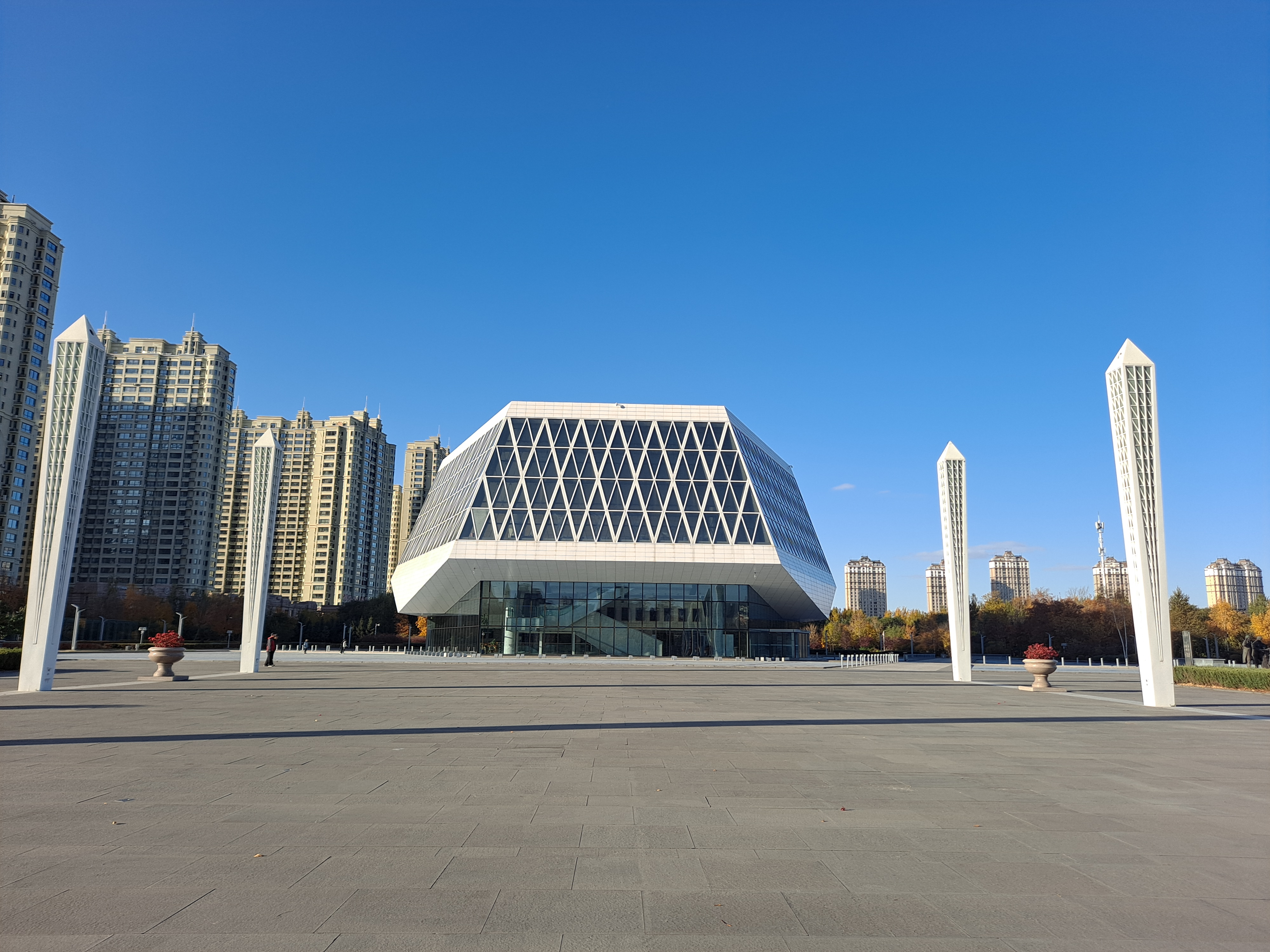
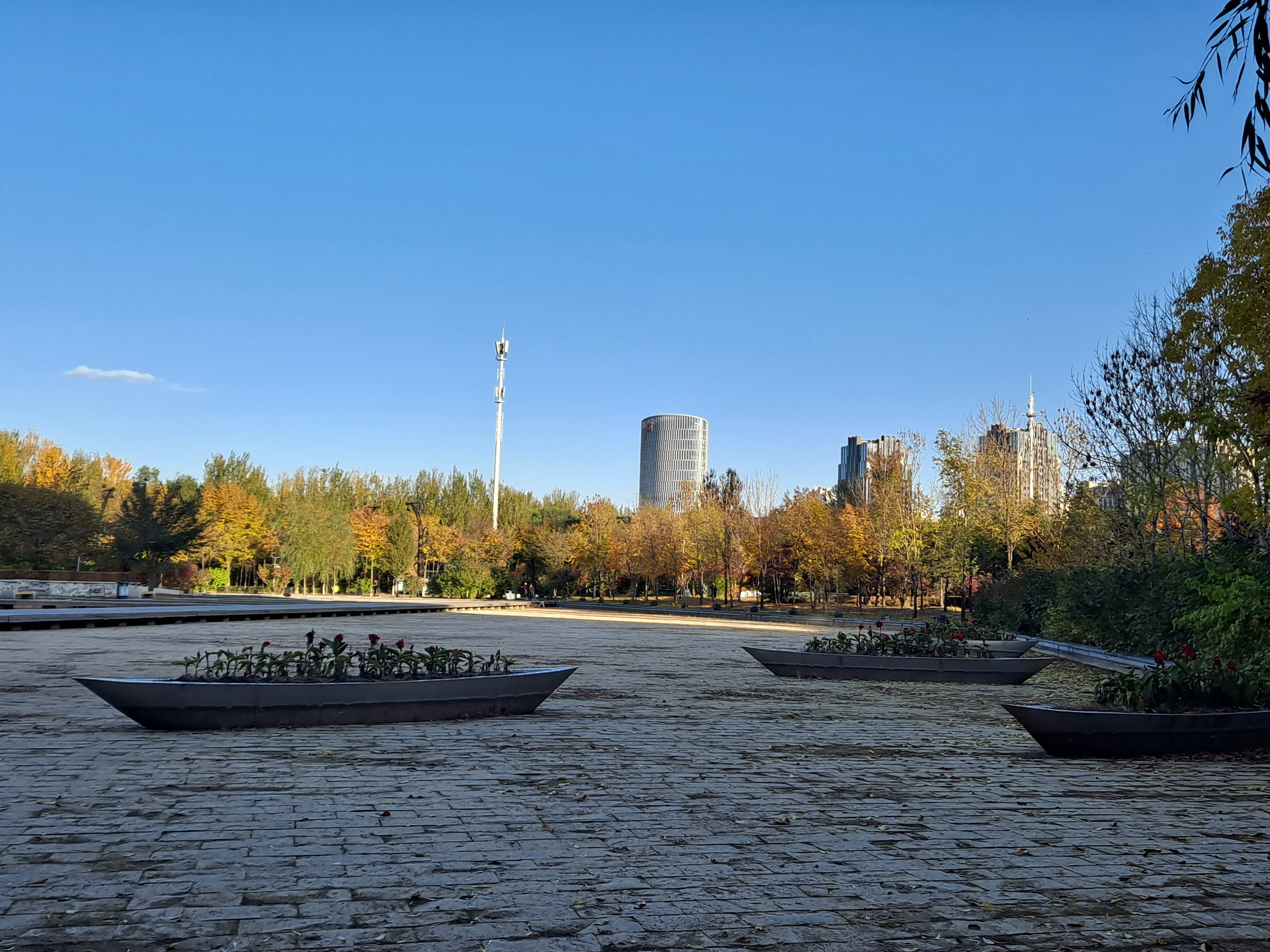
- Interactive map of the Harbin Concert Hall area

General information
- Status: Completed
- Type: Performing arts centre
- Location: Daoli District, Harbin, China
- Groundbreaking: May 2011
- Inaugurated: 2014

Design and construction
- Architect: Arata Isozaki

Website
- www.hrbso.com/home/

The Harbin Concert Hall (Chinese: 哈尔滨音乐厅; pinyin: Hā'ěrbīn Yīnyuètīng) is a multi-venue performing arts centre in Harbin, Heilongjiang Province, China. The building is designed Japanese architect Arata Isozaki.

== Description ==
The concert hall is situated in Harbin, hosting city of the renowned annual Harbin Summer Music Concert and a metropolis where China's first ever orchestra was established. The building serves as the home of the Harbin Symphony Orchestra.

The concert hall was situated on Maimai Street, Daoli District before 2014.

== Concerts and performances ==
In 2016, the third Alice & Eleonore Schoenfeld International String Competition hosted by the city of Harbin was held at the concert hall.

And the Harbin Symphony Orchestra and the Israel Philharmonic Orchestra have performed two concerts conducted by Zubin Mehta in the frame of 33rd Harbin Summer Music Festival.

== Performance venues and facilities ==
The Harbin Concert Hall includes a number of performance venues:

- Concert Hall: Consists of 1200 seats, it is the main part.
- Small Concert Hall: The second largest part consists of 400 seats.
- Dressing rooms and Rehearsal Halls
