= CityLife (Milan) =

District in Milan, Italy

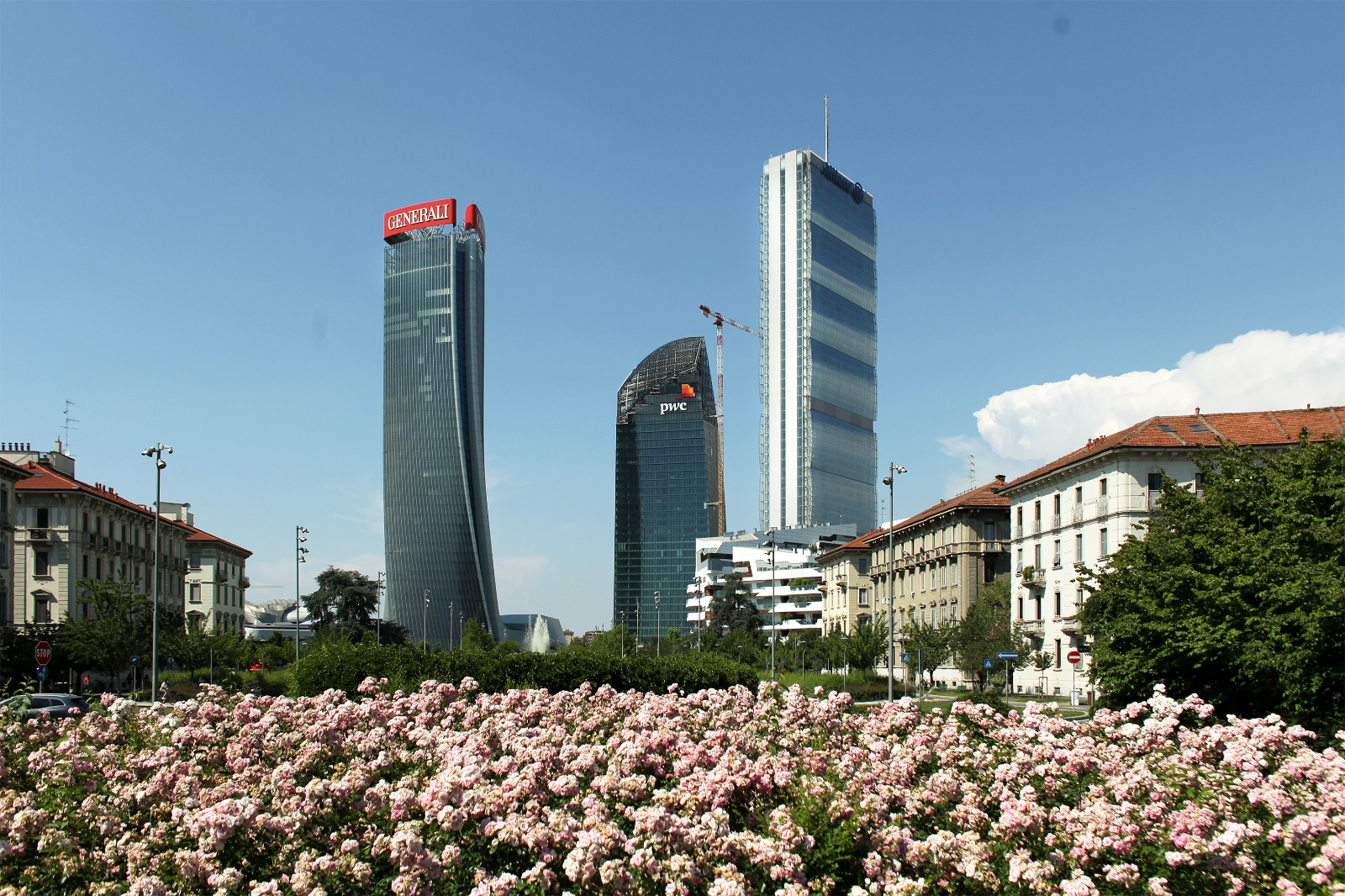
- CityLife in 2020
- Interactive map of CityLife
- Location: Municipality 8, Milan, Italy
- Status: Completed
- Groundbreaking: 2007
- Estimated completion: 2025
- Website: city-life.it

Companies
- Architect: Arata Isozaki & Associates; Studio Daniel Libeskind; Zaha Hadid Architects; Andrea Maffei Architects; ARUP; Gustafson Porter; One Works; Ove Arup !melk
- Structural engineer: ARUP
- Contractor: Tre Torri Contractor
- Developer: Generali Group

Technical details
- Cost: €2 billion
- Size: 36.6 ha (90 acres)

CityLife is a residential, commercial and business district situated a short distance from the old city centre of Milan, Italy; it has an area of 36.6 hectares (90 acres). It is a redevelopment project on the former grounds of Fiera Milano after its relocation to the nearby town of Rho.

The development is being carried out by a company controlled by Generali Group after its winning offer of €523 million for the rights. The project was designed by famous architects such as Zaha Hadid, Arata Isozaki and Daniel Libeskind.

== History ==
The new exhibition centre in Rho-Pero opened in 2005, 85 years after the first Trade Fair in April 1920. The Fiera's move to an area outside Milan benefitted the city by eliminating traffic problems caused by big events and by freeing up a highly valuable area. An international tender for the redevelopment of the old Fiera area, seeking to create an unprecedented level of connectivity with the surrounding urban context, concluded in 2004. The CityLife project won the competition due to the high level of architectural and environmental quality it offered.

The 20 exhibition halls, with a total volume of about 2,500,000 m^{3} (88,000,000 cu ft), were demolished and submitted to remediation in 2007 and 2008. Painstaking efforts were made to protect and recover the area's stock of trees, 120 of which were saved and relocated to the public parks across Milan. Since 2007, a Permanent Environmental Observatory has been working to protect the surrounding districts. Administered by local public authorities, it controls the noise, dust and environmental impact during all stages of construction, using, among other things, sound-absorbing and dust protective solutions.

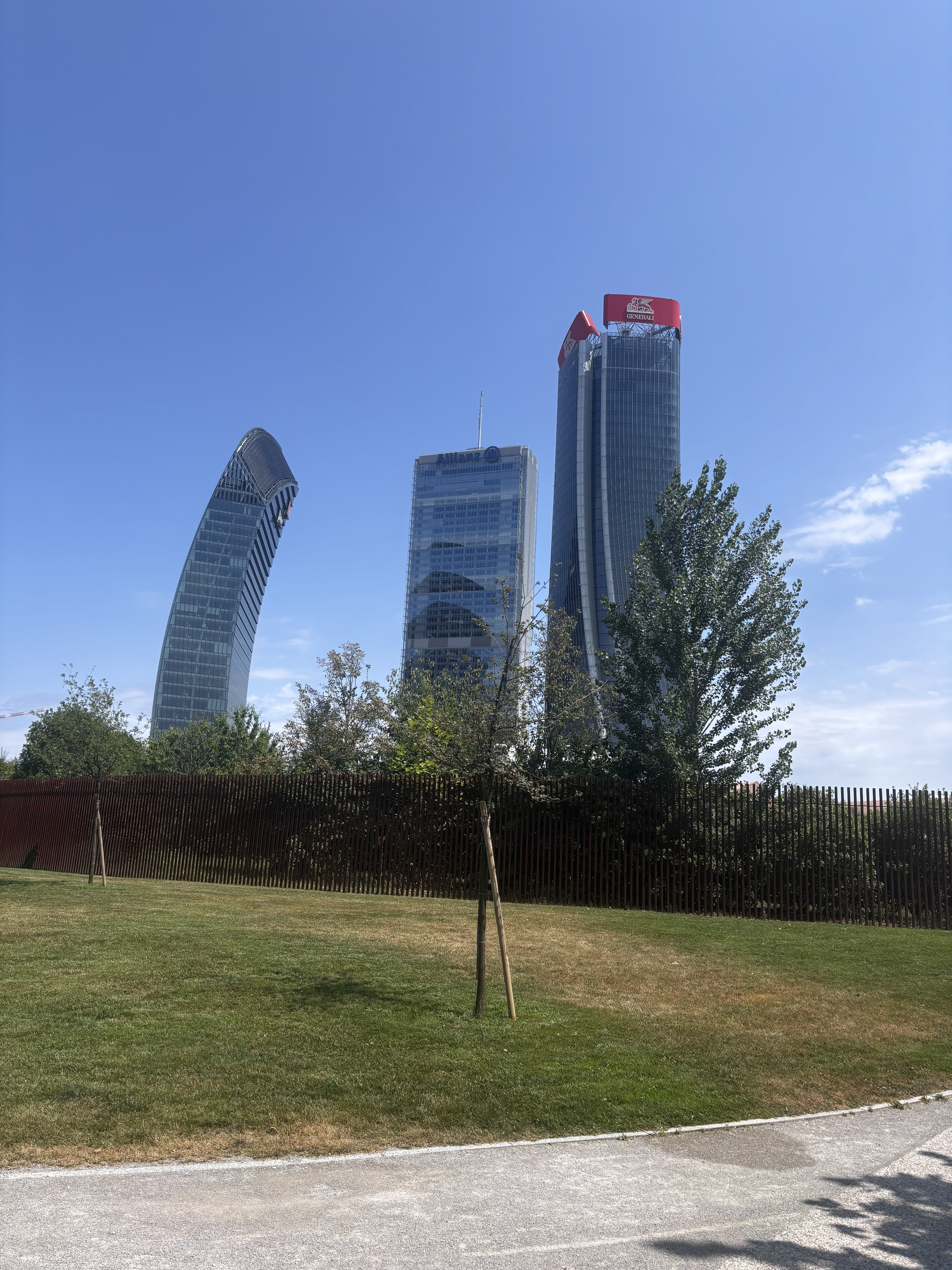
The ‘Tre Torri’ in July 2025

At the end of July 2014, Generali Group reached an agreement with Allianz to become the sole owner of CityLife, through the acquisition of the remaining 33% of the company that manages CityLife. At the same time, Allianz will acquire Il Dritto and part of the residential district within the area. CityLife has also reached a binding agreement with the financial institutions financing the project to redefine some terms and conditions of the original deal.

== Development project ==
=== General project and layout ===
The project involves the construction of three skyscrapers, with dedicated areas for offices, stores, restaurants and services. The luxury residential area will cover about 164,000 m^{2} (1,770,000 sq ft), with around 1,300 apartments (housing about 4,500 people). In addition, more than 50% of the available area, 170,000 m^{2} (1,800,000 sq ft) are dedicated to green spaces. There will also be underground parking space for around 7,000 vehicles. Further to the existing public transportation network, the CityLife area will be served by a new extension of the metro line 5, with a dedicated station at the centre of Piazza Tre Torri.

=== Construction ===
Timeline of completed works:

- 2009–13 Daniel Libeskind Residences; Zaha Hadid Residences
- 2010 Green parterres
- 2010–12 Underground line (work as pertaining to CityLife)
- 2012–15 Il Dritto ("The Straight One") – Allianz Tower
- 2013 Park (first portion of 25,000 m^{2} (270,000 sq ft))
- 2013–15 Park (second portion of 33,000 m^{2} (360,000 sq ft))
- 2013–18 Shopping district
- 2014–17 Lo Storto ("The Twisted One") – Generali Tower
- 2015–16 Park (later portion)
- 2016–20 Il Curvo ("The Curved One")

Timeline of works under construction:

- 2021–26 CityWave

=== Sustainability ===
CityLife is equipped with some alternative energy systems. Its installations mainly use sources such as ground water, district heating, and photovoltaics. The Tre Torri offices have been awarded the GOLD level LEED™ pre-certification, but actual accreditation and post-occupancy performance is yet to be conducted and confirmed.

=== Smart mobility ===
CityLife is the largest car-free area in Milan and one of the biggest in Europe. Cars can reach garages and parking areas along an innovative underground road system. A cycle and pedestrian path crosses the area from east to west. Broad avenues lead from the residences to the centre of the district where to find shops, bars and restaurants overlooking the park.

== Architecture and design ==
=== Skyscrapers ===
==== Il Dritto ("The Straight One") – Allianz Tower ====
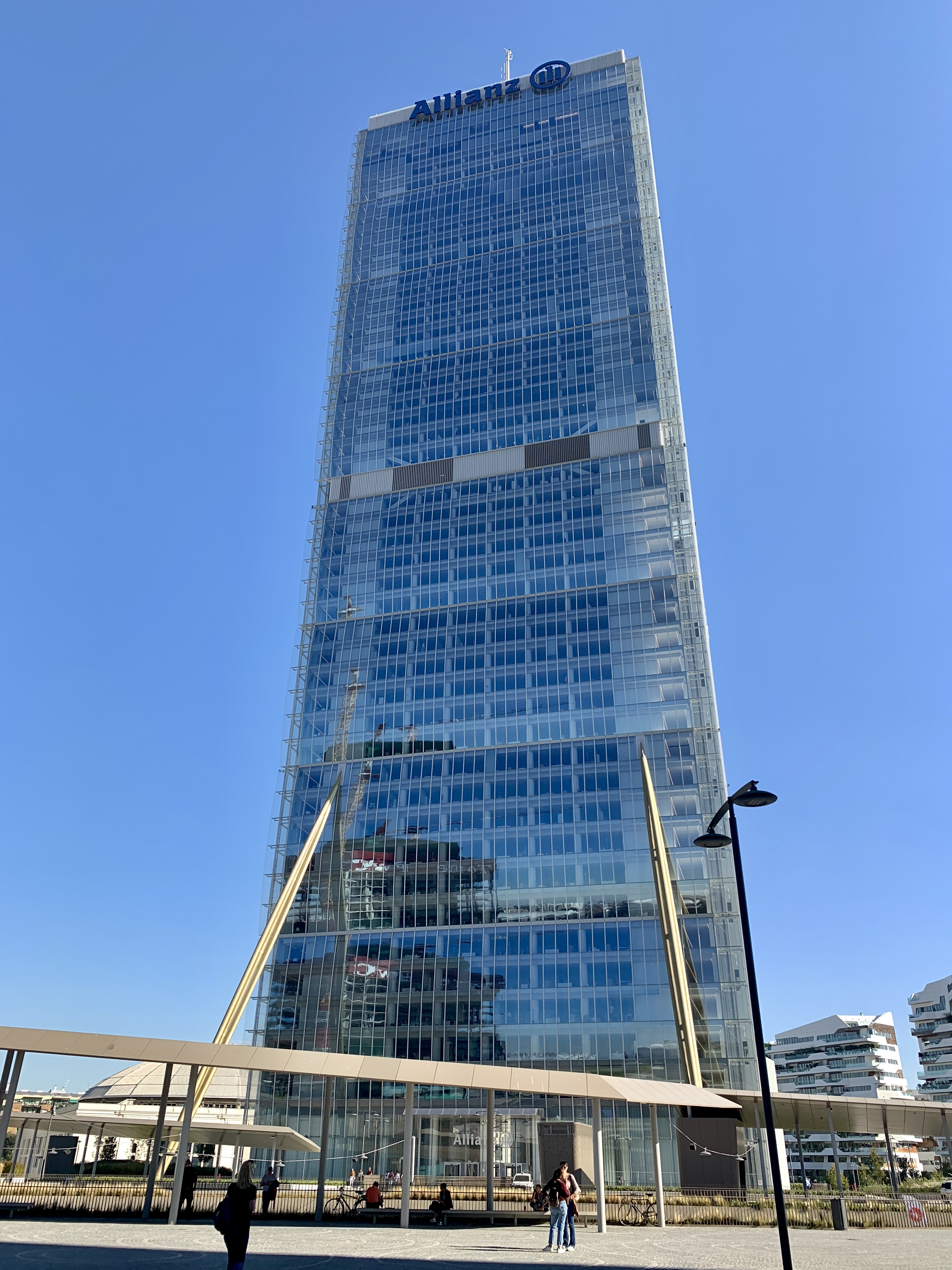

==== Lo Storto ("The Twisted One") – Generali Tower ====
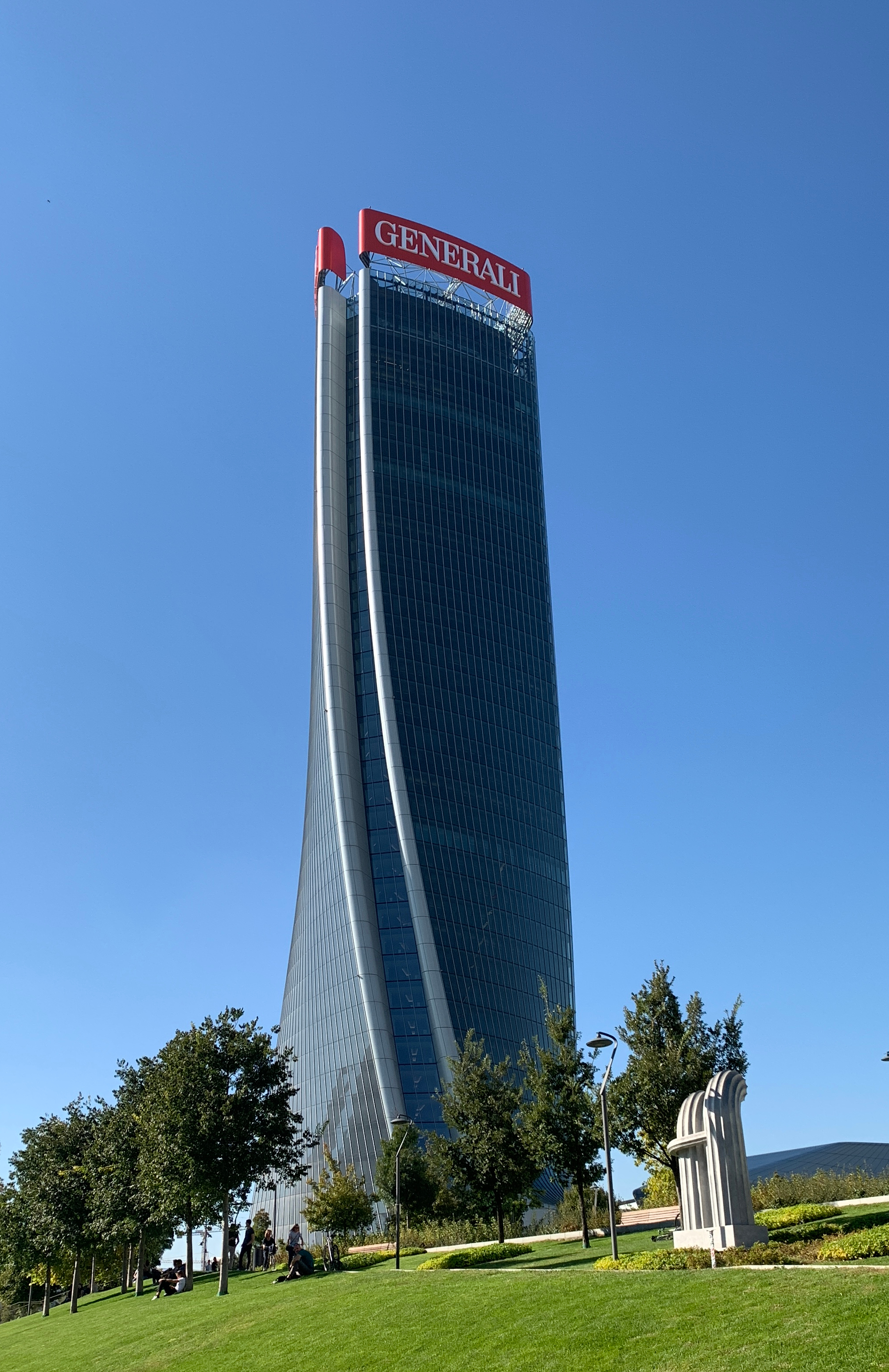

==== Il Curvo ("The Curved One") ====
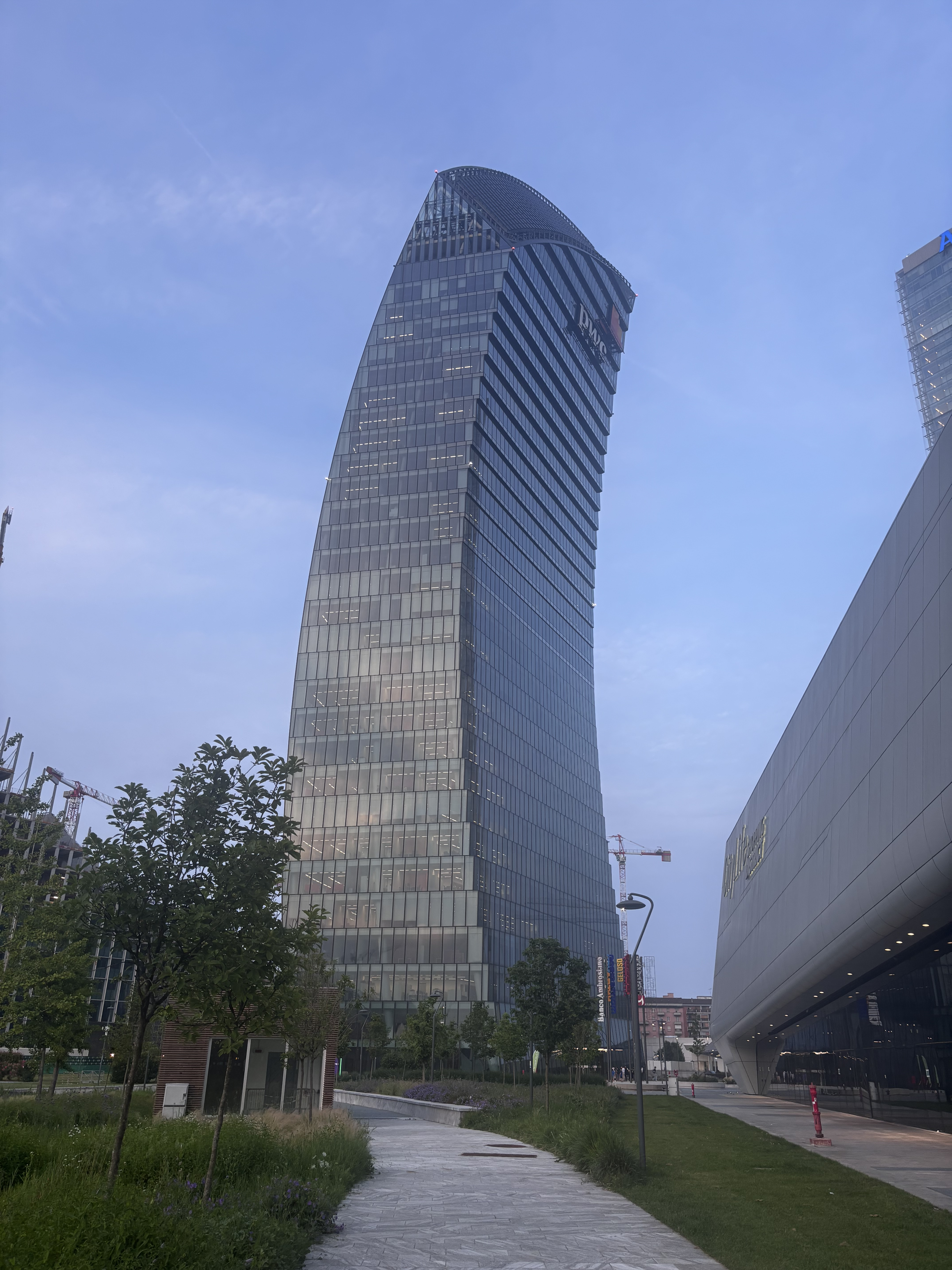

=== Residences ===
==== Hadid Residences ====
Situated in the south-east part of the CityLife area, the residences on Via Senofonte have been designed by Zaha Hadid. The residences are composed of seven buildings offering a wide range of possibilities from one-bed apartments to double-height penthouses.

The residences on Via Senofonte are accessed through their lobbies, each with distinctive architectural features, such as windows overlooking the park. The design details and finishes contribute to the character of the entrances. The furniture, designed by Zaha Hadid, is integrated into the spaces through its “soft and enveloping” lines. The residences designed by Zaha Hadid provide their inhabitants with a daily experience characterised by fluidity and lightness. The residences on Via Senofonte follow the sinuous course of the roofs and balconies, creating a dynamic effect that echoes the landscape below.

The gardens of the residences designed by Zaha Hadid follow the flowing lines of the buildings and are moved by paved paths and grassy areas with slight depressions that create pleasant rest areas. The courtyards offer a quiet and safe environment with striking views over the city and the park. The residences on Via Senofonte are Class A certified.

==== Libeskind Residences ====
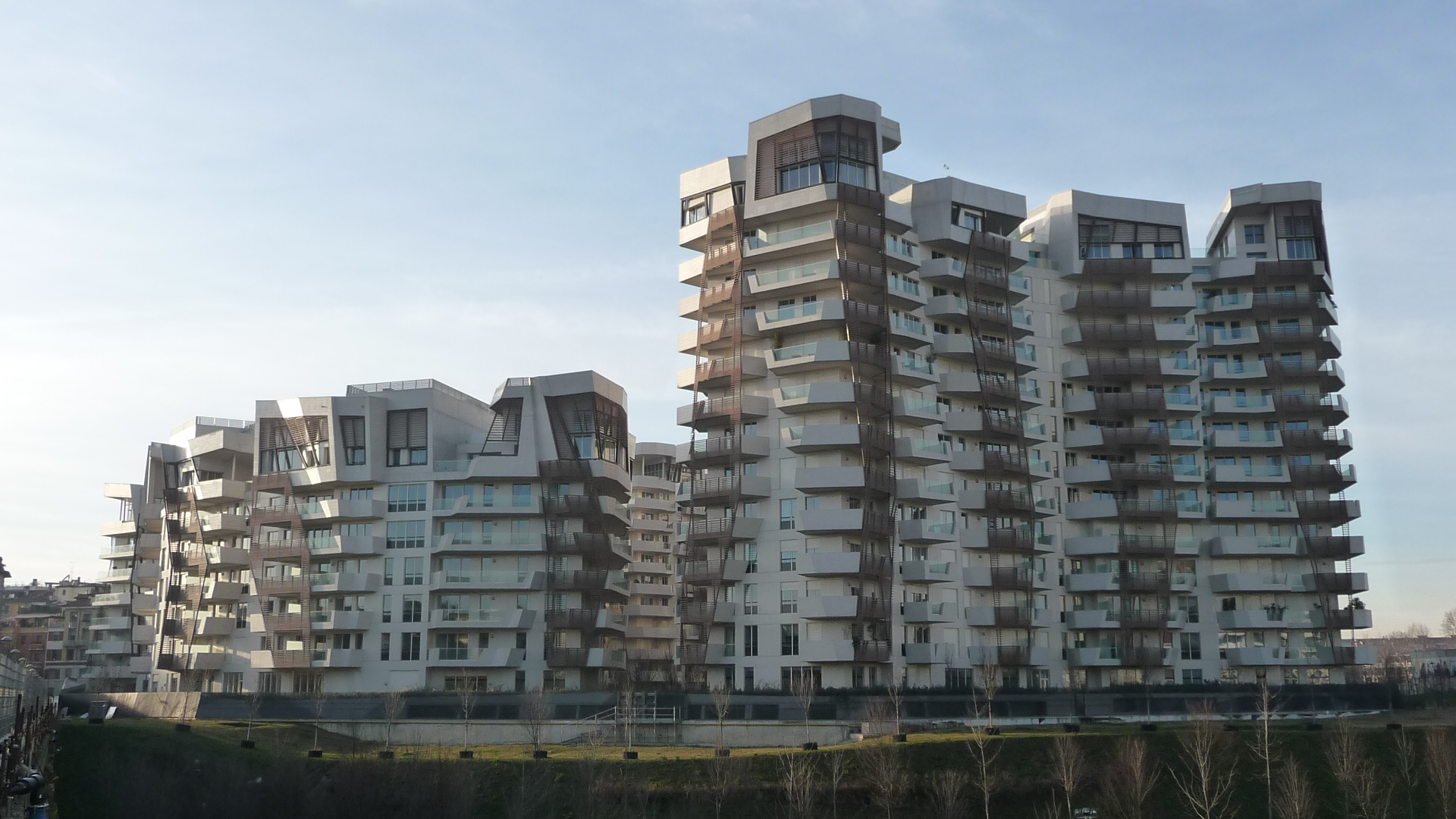
Libeskind Residences

Situated in the south-west part of the CityLife area, the residences on Via Spinola have been designed by Daniel Libeskind. The residences are composed of five buildings offering a wide range of possibilities from one-bed apartments to double-height penthouses.

The residences on Via Spinola are in the stylish Fiera Milano district, between Piazza Giulio Cesare and Piazza Amendola. On one side they look out over the new public park with panoramic views of the Alps and the city centre. Daniel Libeskind has designed a residential archipelago to best meet the needs of modern living: the design reinterprets the classic residential courtyard model to create a circular pattern. The alternation of façade materials and the vertical orientation of the alignments give a sculptural effect to the buildings. A system of balconies creates outdoor spaces of different depths for each apartment.

There are private gardens and access roads to buildings along the perimeter. In the middle of a natural landscape, with pleasant rest areas, the courtyard is built on a circular hill that descends gradually towards the underground road. The residences on Via Spinola are Class A certified.

=== Culture ===
==== Palazzo delle Scintille ====
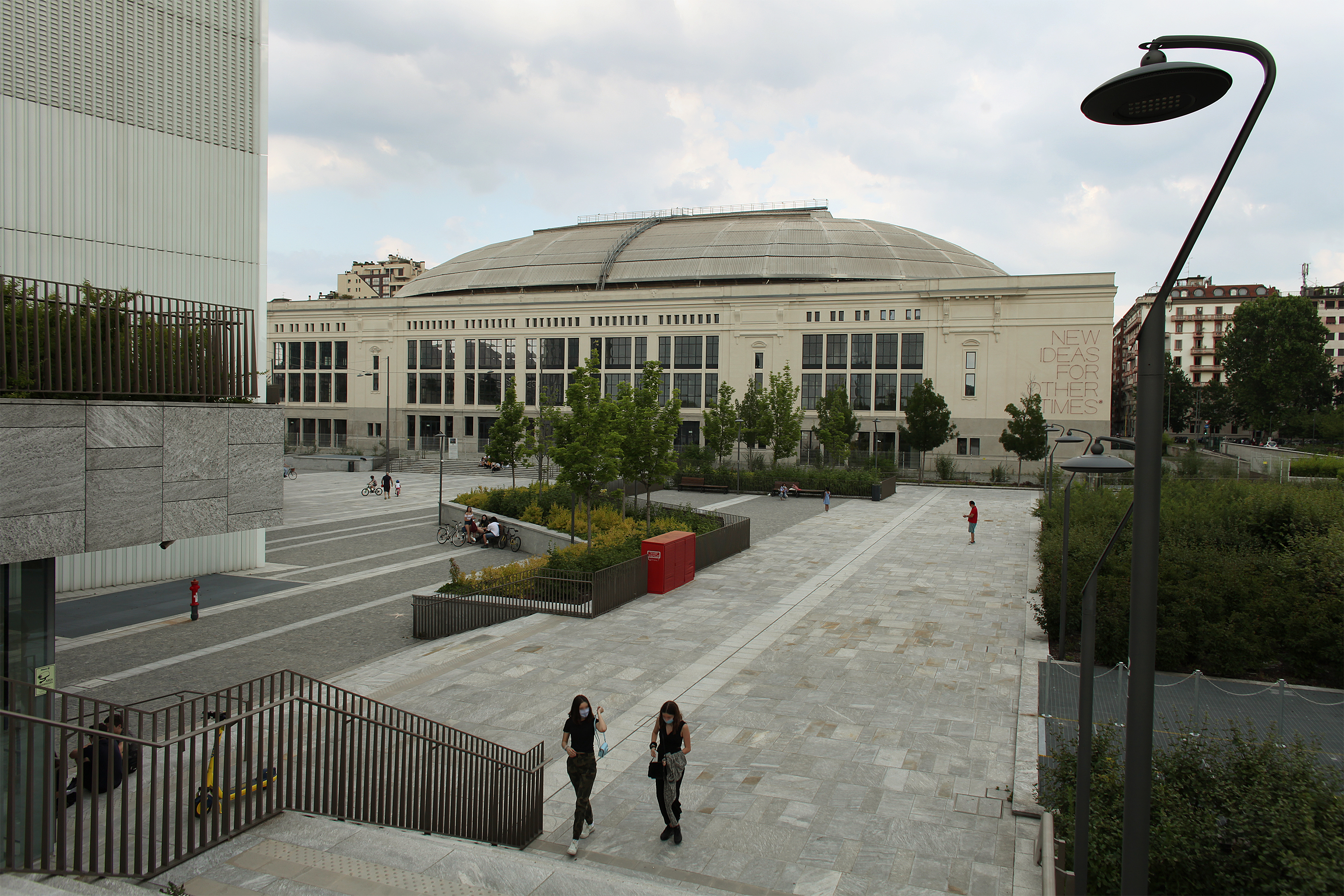
Former Pavillon 3, now Palazzo delle Scintille

The former Pavilion 3 of Fiera Milano City, which is located in Viale Cassiodoro with a total area of 15,500 m^{2} (167,000 sq ft), was reconstructed. It used to be called 'Palazzo dello Sport', and was built by Paolo Vietti-Violi in April 1923 for the Milan Motor Show. As of November of the same year, it was equipped with a velodrome. It was one of the first buildings to see the light in the emerging Fiera Milano exhibition district. It has been renamed 'Palazzo delle Scintille', a place for culture, fashion and design exhibitions at international level.

=== Public spaces & other buildings ===
==== Piazza Tre Torri ====
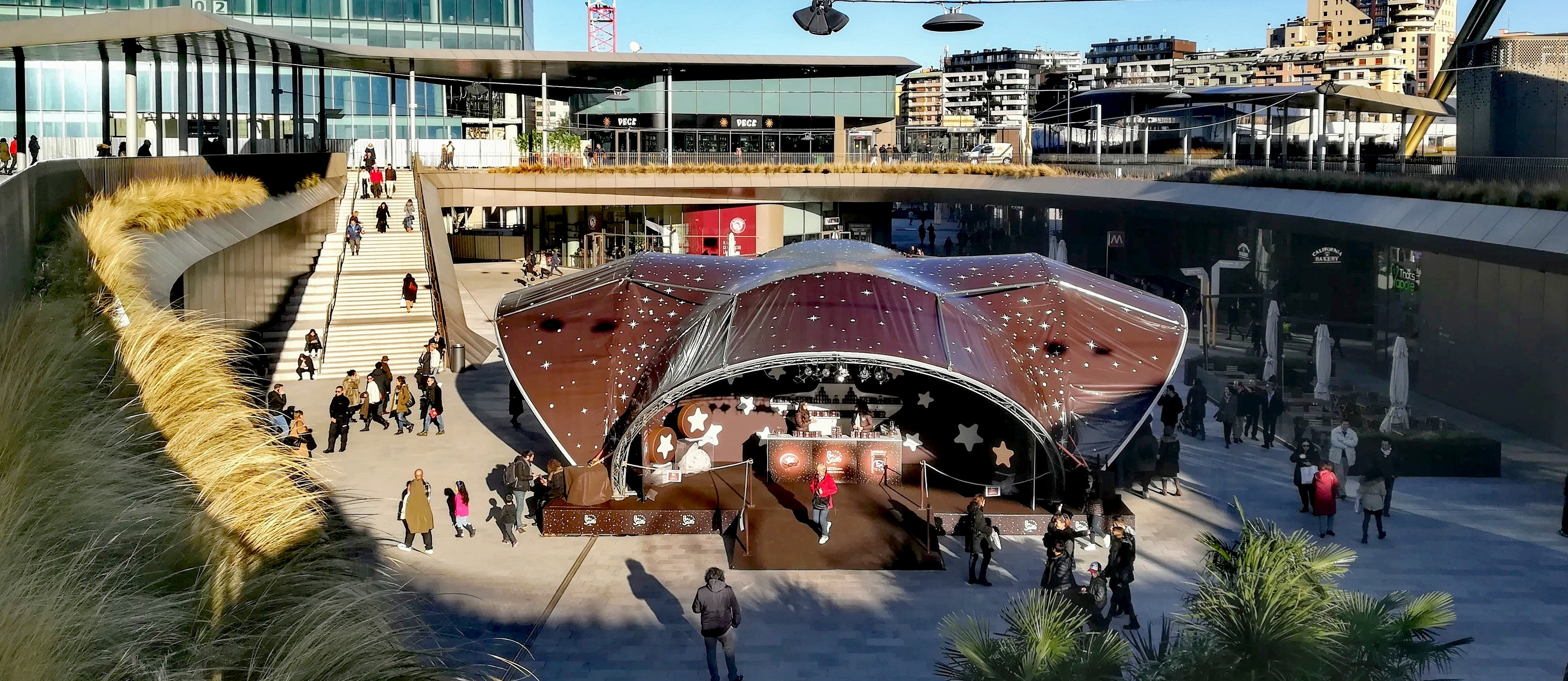
Piazza Tre Torri during the Christmas period

The Piazza Tre Torri, designed by One Works, is located in the centre of the three towers along the pedestrian pathway which links Largo Domodossola with the new public park. The double storey plaza reveals itself at the two principal levels of the public domain, acting as a junction between the park and the pedestrian axis Domodossola. Within the same design scope is the below-ground parking in addition to the basement levels of the Il Dritto which connect the parking lots to the above commercial activity. Retail functions, strongly characterized in part by the fashion mall at the base of the Lo Storto, and the outdoor commercial activity distributed around the plaza and along the pathway towards Piazza VI Febbraio, allow the public square to open itself up to the city and the surrounding park.

The public plaza's configuration highlights three important aspects. Firstly, the plaza links the park's southern and northern parts, therefore between the present-day Piazza Giulio Cesare and Via Domodossola. Secondly, it establishes an east–west relationship, which correlates Piazza VI Febbraio with the fashion mall and park to the west. Finally, the central Tre Torri Plaza is an urban fulcrum and integral part of the described pathway system. Moreover, this horizontal movement flow network superimposes a vertical system, which links all three towers at both their access levels and the two public reference levels of the entire project, with the metro station.

The strong spatial articulation is resolved through large openings that overlook the underground plaza, freeing the view of the three towers from below and allowing for direct integration with the same. The lower level, defined by the ceiling design that turns up into the large apertures and partly onto the blind façades between the windows, reinforces once again the continuity of place between diverse levels. The shrubbery and ornamental grasses, which ornate the flowerbeds in front of the towers, help to confer a certain intimacy to the private outdoor areas. Shrubs and colourful flower borders, some of which will variate with the change of seasons, frame all openings.

The plaza's illumination source hangs from cables strung between facing buildings. In this specific case, the electrical cables use the canopy's structural supports as their starting point and run throughout the open space, illuminating both levels at the same time.

==== CityLife Park ====
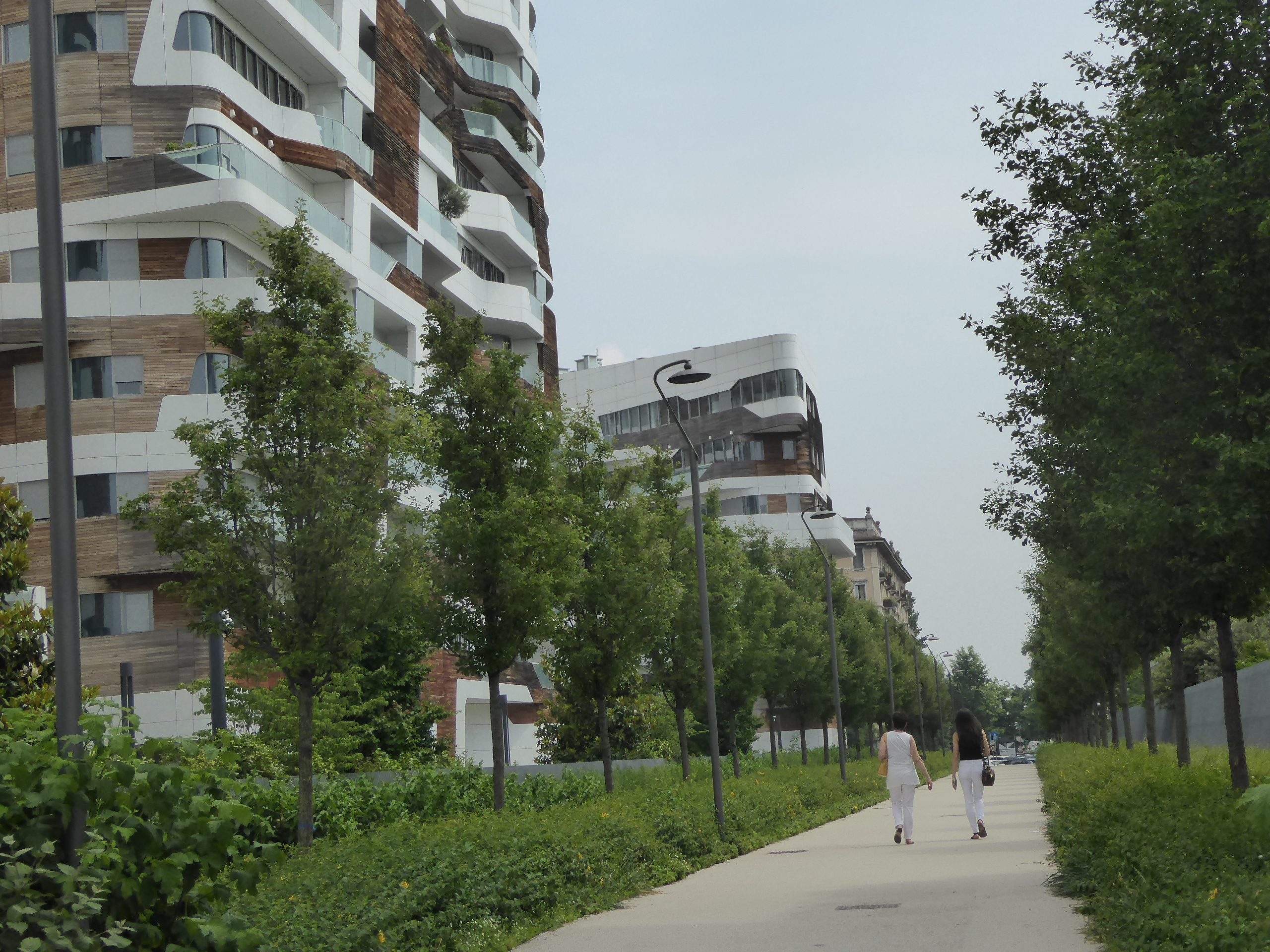
Via Luciano Berio

With an area of about 170,000 m^{2} (1,800,000 sq ft), it includes cycling and walking paths. It also completes the group of parks in the north-west of Milan, with Parco Sempione and the park of Porta Nuova Business District. The international competition for the design of the park was launched in 2010 and was won by the architectural studios Gustafson Porter, Melk, One Works and Ove Arup.

The south entrance to the new park will be the historic Fountain of the Four Seasons (Fontana delle quattro stagioni) in Piazza Giulio Cesare, restored to its working order. A little further north a fountain creates a new attraction and evokes the landscapes typical of the Lombard plain.

==== Podium ====
The total GLA of the Podium is about 20,000 m^{2} (220,000 sq ft) and includes retail, multiplex cinema, food court. The structure is based on framed schemes, made by steel girders and concrete slabs on folded plates, arranged in a composite structural mechanism. The structure is crossed by a major point of the substructure, so that horizontal stability is achieved by the use of separate systems—combination of concrete cores and steel bracings—for the two halves of the structural body. The column arrangement has to follow the free-form internal space and to match with the substructure structural grid. As a result, spans are variable and many areas feature very long spans and cantilevers, which are solved by using truss girders in plane and spatial arrangements. The façade structures must allow free movements of the superstructure and follow the outer skin shape, and are based on vertical frames of variable shape, mostly following hybrid truss and beam schemes.

==== Nursery ====
A design competition for architects aged under 35 led to the design of an entirely new concept of a nursery in accordance with the latest teaching methods. This new nursery will be built entirely of wood and with zero emissions and it will nestle in the midst of the CityLife park.

== Transport ==
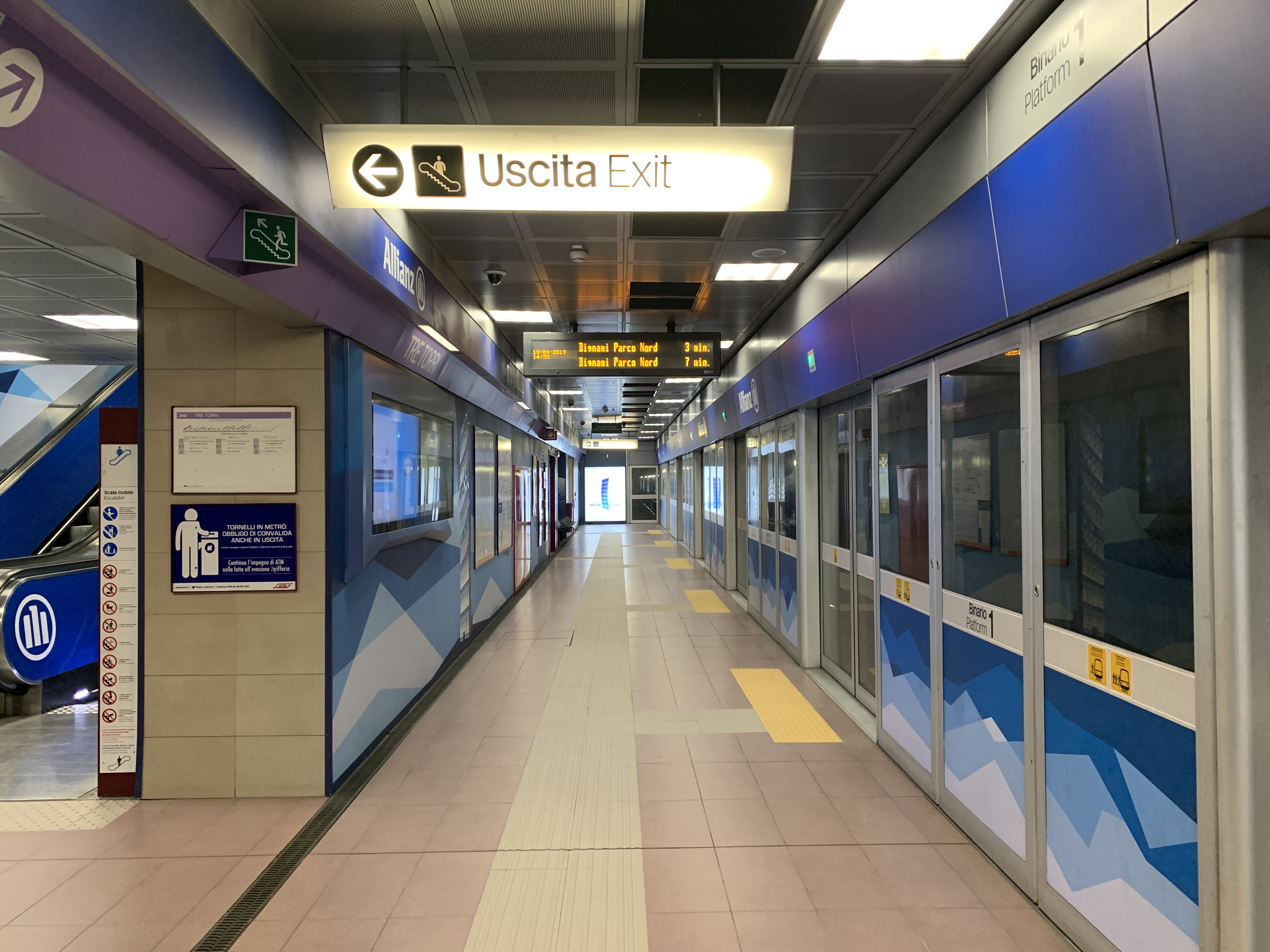
M5 Tre Torri station

Within CityLife area:
Tre Torri

Near CityLife area:
Amendola
Buonarroti
Domodossola
Portello

== Adjacent developments ==
=== MiCo Milan Convention Centre ===
The current MiCo Milano Convention Centre—redesigned by Italian architect Mario Bellini—is among the largest conference facilities in Europe and worldwide.

Featuring two plenary rooms, one with seating for 4,000 and the other for 2,000 and an Auditorium that seats 1,500, it is the ideal venue for large-scale performances and for international conferences requiring a large number of rooms. In the same way, the exhibition halls offer 54,000 m^{2} (580,000 sq ft) of exhibition space and can also be set up as extra plenary rooms accommodating more than 5,000 people. The conference rooms feature the full range of technologies. A parking lot for more than 1,100 cars and a heliport are included.

=== Vigorelli Velodrome ===
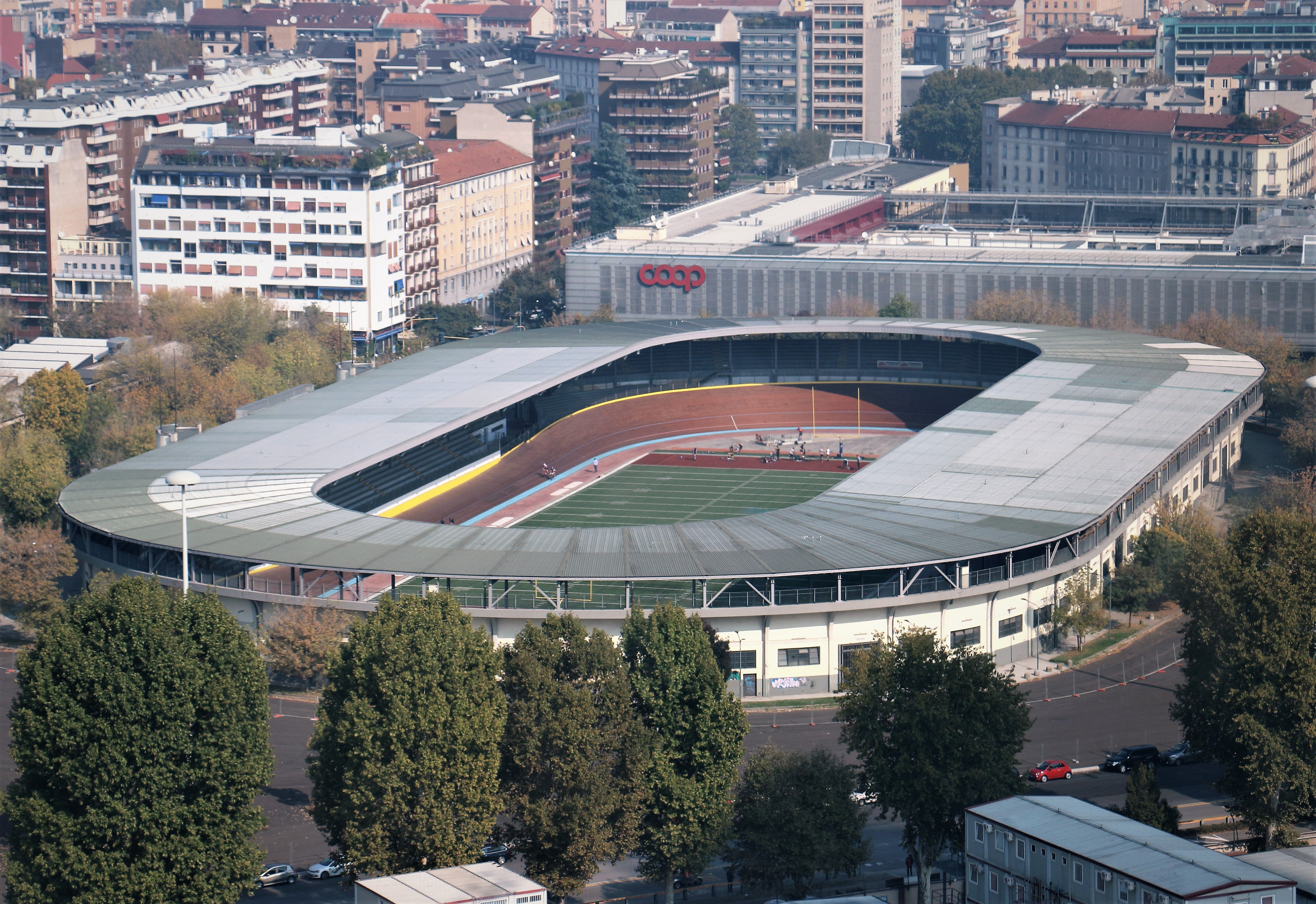
The Vigorelli Velodrome, opened in 1935

The Vigorelli Velodrome — the venue of World Championships track cycling races and the Six-Days race — was renovated as part of the CityLife transformation project, returning the sports venue to Milan.
