= Harbin Symphony Orchestra =

Chinese Symphony Orchestra

- Orchestra
- Native name: 哈尔滨交响乐团
- Former name: Chinese Eastern Railway Club Symphony Orchestra
- Founded: 1908
- Location: Harbin, Heilongjiang, China
- Concert hall: Harbin Concert Hall
- Music director: Tang Muhai
- Website: www.hrbso.com

Harbin Symphony Orchestra (Chinese: 哈尔滨交响乐团) is a Chinese symphony orchestra based in Harbin, Heilongjiang, China. The orchestra's home is the Harbin Concert Hall.

== History ==
The Harbin Symphony Orchestra (formerly Chinese Eastern Railway Club Symphony Orchestra) was created in 1908 on the Orchestra of Russian TRANS-AMUR Railway Corps Brigade after their performance of 1812 Overture which is considered as the first symphony concert in China. 2011, with the inauguration of the new Harbin Concert Hall, the orchestra moved in to the new venue and started to plan annual concert seasons. In 2016, the Harbin Symphony Orchestra and the Israel Philharmonic Orchestra have performed two concerts conducted by Zubin Mehta.

== Direction ==
- Art director: Tang Muhai
- Executive director: Qu Bo
- Chief conductor: Yu Xuefeng
- Guest chief conductor: Harmen Cnossen

== See also ==
- Harbin Concert Hall
