= Domus (museum) =

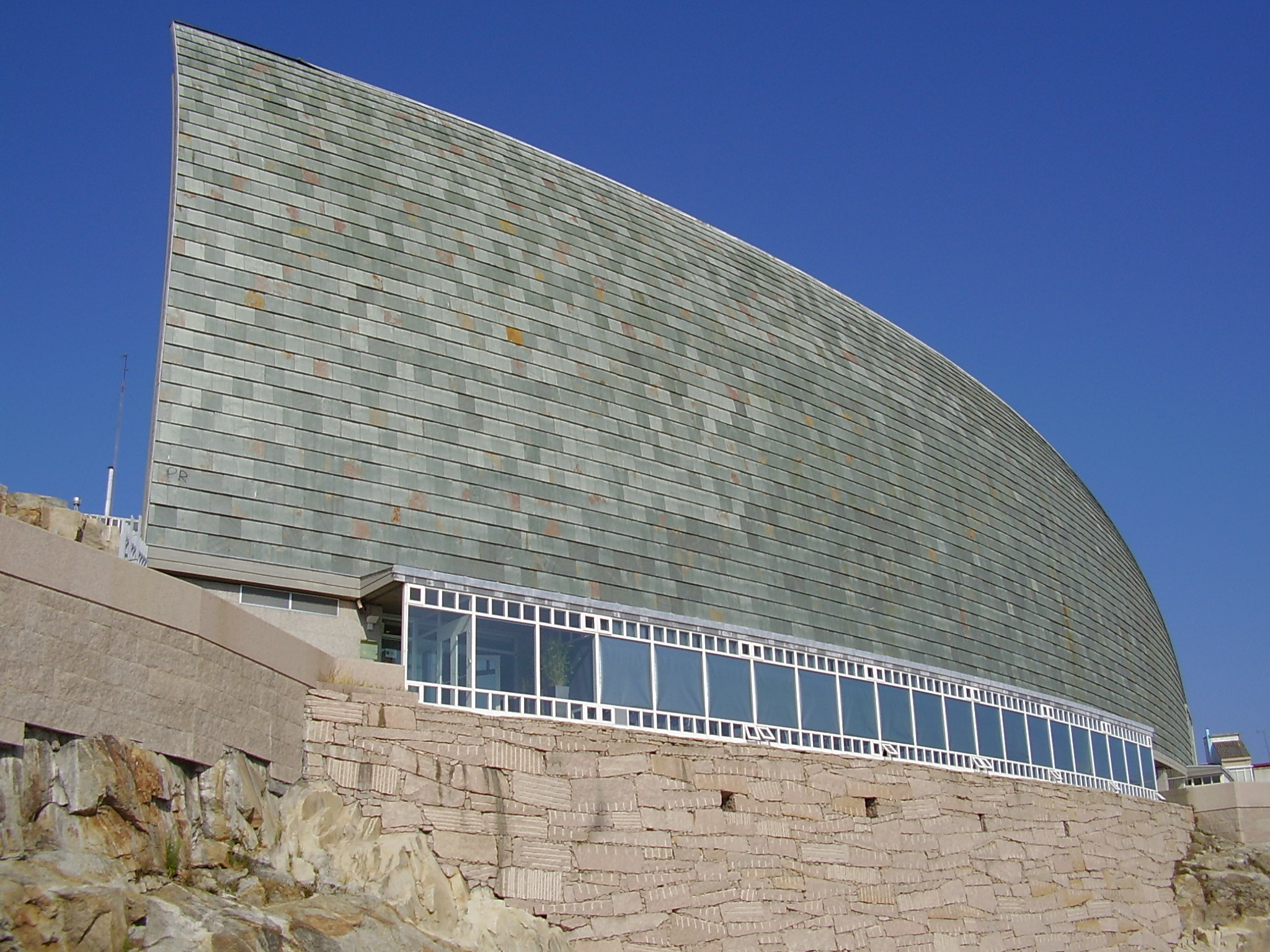
- Facade of the museum.
- Former name: Casa del Hombre
- Established: April 7, 1995; 31 years ago
- Location: A Coruña, Galicia, Spain
- Coordinates: 43.3776°N 8.4065°W
- Type: Science museum
- Architects: Arata Isozaki and César Portela
- Website: Official website of the museum

The Domus, formerly known in Spanish as "Casa del Hombre", is a science museum located in A Coruña, in Galicia, Spain. It was inaugurated on April 7, 1995.

== Background and Architecture ==
The museum was conceived by Ramón Núñez Centella and designed by architects Arata Isozaki and César Portela.

It includes walls and staircases made of granite, and on its facade it includes 6,600 pieces of slate. The museum includes 1500 m^{2} of space for exhibitions, spread over almost 200 modules. Most of them are interactive.

== See also ==
- Aquarium Finisterrae
