= Team Disney Orlando =

Office building in Bay Lake, Florida

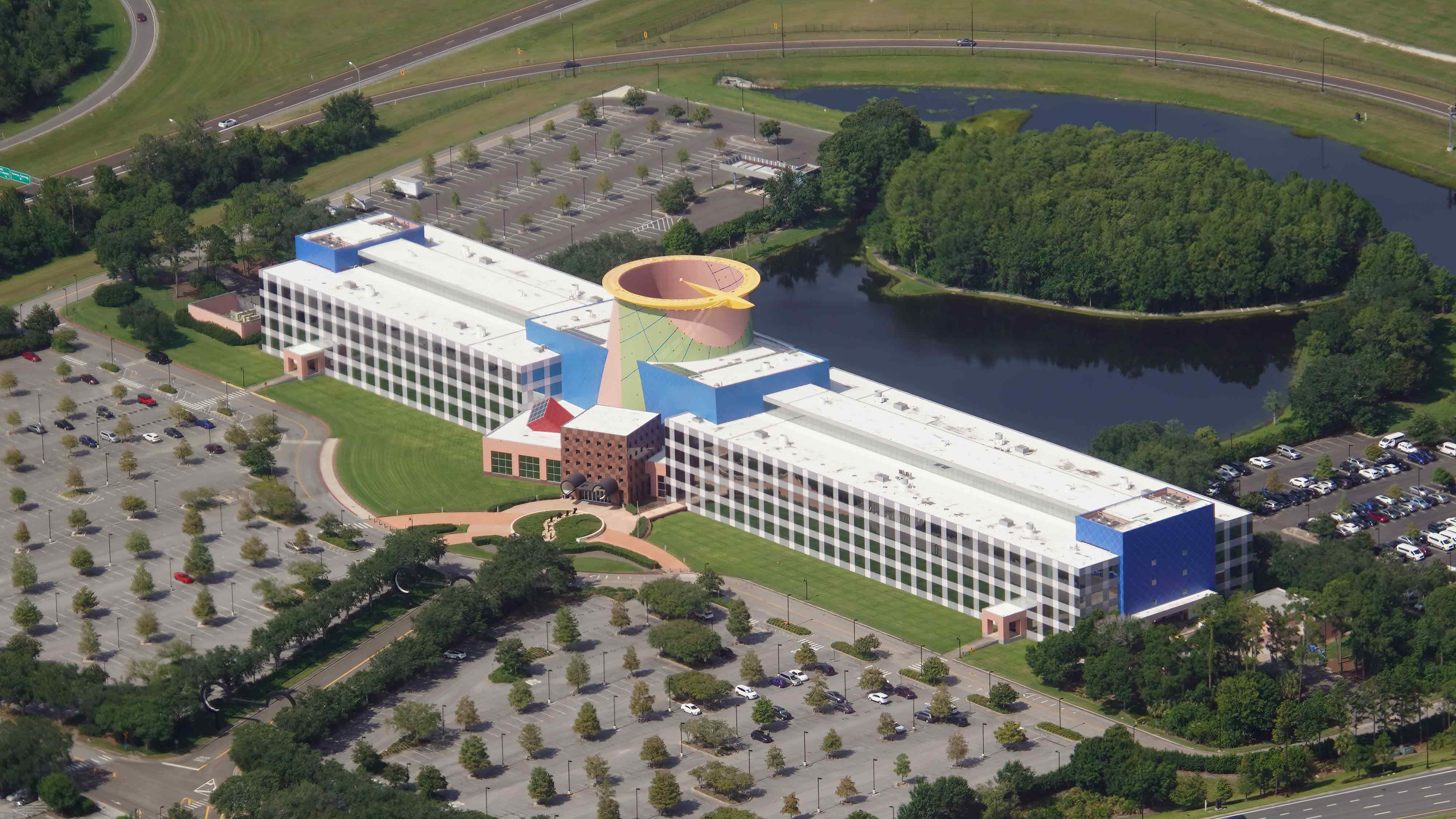
- Interactive map of the Team Disney Orlando area

General information
- Type: Office
- Architectural style: Postmodernism
- Location: 1375 East Buena Vista Drive; Lake Buena Vista, Florida 32830, United States of America
- Coordinates: 28.365389°N 81.521331°W
- Opened: June 3, 1991
- Owner: Walt Disney World Co.

Technical details
- Floor count: 4
- Floor area: 401,000 square feet (37,300 m^{2})

Design and construction
- Architect: Arata Isozaki
- Developer: Disney Development Company
- Other designers: Hunton Brady Pryor Maso
- Main contractor: Holder Construction
- Awards and prizes: American Institute of Architects 1992 Honor Awards

Team Disney Orlando is an office building located in Lake Buena Vista, Florida on the grounds of Walt Disney World Resort across from Disney Springs. The building is the administrative headquarters of Walt Disney World Resort, and home of the Finance, Accounting, Business Insight & Improvement, and Legal departments. It also houses several resources for cast members, including a gym, canteen, and credit union.

== History ==
=== Background ===
Disney CEO Michael Eisner had a long history with postmodern architecture, having previously worked with architect Michael Graves. Eisner selected Japanese architect Arata Isozaki to lead the project. In an interview, Isozaki said that "the 'creative freedom' offered by Eisner along with his childhood interest in Disney were what convinced him to accept the role." The building was the second "Team Disney" building to be built, after Team Disney Burbank was built, and was followed by "Team Disney" buildings in Anaheim and Hong Kong.

=== Design and Construction ===
Main Entrance Facade

Isozaki came up with multiple possible designs, and chose a low-rise after it was decided that a high-rise would not fit in with the surroundings. Isozaki was upset when the construction location was moved from its original planned location at Disney's Caribbean Beach Resort to the final location near Interstate-4. As a compromise, Disney built a lake to the west of the new location. The Florida Solar Energy Center was consulted in the design of the sundial. Orlando-based architecture firm Hunton Brady Pryor Maso was hired to oversee the construction, and is listed as the Architect of record.

=== Opening and use ===
The building was opened officially on June 3, 1991 to consolidate several other offices located around Orlando. The reflecting pools were removed in 2010. The interior was remodeled in 2016, 25 years after the original opening. The building is primarily occupied by cast members working in administrative roles, such as finance or human resources. Over 1,000 cast members work in the building. The building contains a gym and a branch of Partners Federal Credit Union.

== Design ==
The building was designed by Japanese architect Arata Isozaki in the postmodern style. The building is built around a central 120 feet (37 m) "stack". Two four-story wings extend out from the stack, which is hollow, and a stylus atop it creates a "solar clock" visible from inside. At the time the sundial was the largest in the world. The interior of the stack is decorated with quotes from both real people and fictional characters, chosen personally by Michael Eisner.

=== Reception ===
Eisner reportedly loved the building, being especially impressed by the courtyard. The building received an honor award from the American Institute of Architects in 1992. Time Magazine listed the building amongst the best design of 1991, describing it as "both utilitarian and whimsical" and likening it to a "cathedral on Venus".
