= New exit for the Uffizi Gallery =

New Exit for the Uffizi Gallery
- Nuova Uscita Galleria Degli Uffizi
- Photomontage of project

General information
- Status: Unbuilt
- Type: Museum
- Architectural style: Modernism
- Location: Florence, Italy
- Completed: Expected after 2012
- Client: Ministry of Culture. Commission for the Architectural and Landscape Heritage for the Provinces of Florence, Pistoia and Prato. Italy.

Technical details
- Structural system: Steel frame and stone supports and cladding

Design and construction
- Architects: Arata Isozaki, Andrea Maffei
- Structural engineer: Cecil Balmond, Gabriele Del Mese, Maurizio Teora, Daniel Bosia, Luca Buzzoni / Arup Italia Srl, Ove Arup & Partners International Ltd
- Awards: 1st Place

The New Exit for the Uffizi Gallery (Italian: Nuova Uscita per la Galleria Degli Uffizi), designed by architects Arata Isozaki and Andrea Maffei, was the project that won the closed international design competition launched in 1998 with the purpose of expanding the museum's exhibition space and creating a grand exit. Many world-renowned architects participated, among whom were: Mario Botta, Norman Foster, Gae Aulenti, Hans Hollein and Vittorio Gregotti. As part of the Grandi Uffizi initiative, a 60 million euro renovation and development project for the overall museum, the loggia's construction became a controversial subject for Florentines and thus has been at a standstill since its original scheduled completion date of 2003. The project was envisioned as a large steel and stone loggia that would echo its counterpart, the Loggia dei Lanzi on Piazza della Signoria. While at the same time, it would comment on the precarious balance that exists between tradition and modernity in a context that seldom sees large architectural change.

== Concept ==
Loggia are common and prominent public structures in Florence; to cite two examples, Loggia dei Lanzi, or the Loggia del Grano. For the final proposal at the competition, the architect Arata Isozaki and Andrea Maffei replicate this traditional form for both its historic but also functional aspects: providing cover and protection from the elements when necessary yet also establishing a new public reference point for Florentine people. The light trapezoidal cover of the loggia, narrows where it connects to the museum, and references, according to the architects, brunelleschian themes from Renaissance. The structure intended to allow the public to interact with the city by providing not only necessary programme and space for the museum's expansion, but to allow for a constant flow of people through a neglected space within the current fabric of the city. In 1990, a design for the exit had already been proposed before the competition. The project by Giovanni Michelucci consisted primarily of a glass prism that would lead people out; it would become a landmark to decorate the back of Giorgio Vasari's famous structure. Though never realized, this endeavor became a forerunner to the competition of 1998.

=== Gallery ===
Model of proposal.

Model of proposal in context.

== Building ==
The proposal for the building was designed as a structure with limited connection to the ground. The use of a historic typology to define the form was an aesthetic choice the competition judges appreciated and awarded. A tall fan-shaped structure, large enough to span the entire slanted site, would be made principally of steel, pietra serena and glass. The new exit was created not to compete with the existing grand entrance, or to deviate visitors from the main promenade through the museum. Instead it was focused on revitalizing the area by Piazza Castellani, which had become an afterthought.

The loggia was designed as a piece that would settle amongst the existing buildings, yet stand in contrast as a modernist addition to the city. The simplicity allowed the architects to create a continuous space, one that would blur the interior with the exterior. Pietra serena was chosen to pave the ground of the exterior sloping plane and outdoor areas, visually merging the space. The canopy was composed of a series of horizontal beams, arranged in a radial manner within a trapezoidal frame. Covered with glass panels, the Tuscan sunlight would filter through the space creating interesting shadows as the sun traversed the sky. Four thick columns support the large horizontal plane, and serve to highlight the existing beauty of Giorgio Vasari's windows, which were not altered in the architect's proposition. The back columns are connected to a stone block that covers the exits, but manages at the same time, to highlight the back facade of the existing building. The areas below the ramp, of approximately 300 square meters, would be designated to the museum's extension, principally in the form of storage. The slope of the site, an important historic element was extended in order to connect the existing Vicolo dell'Oro street and the network of smaller passageways with Via dei Leoni. At the center of the space, the architects decided to place four of the Uffizi's sculptures on pedestals matching the exit sequence at the back.

The new intervention intended to create an interesting reciprocity between the new structure and that of the Loggia del Grano (its historic complement that dominates the corner across the street) and "become an instrument for the museum to communicate with the city".

== Current debate ==
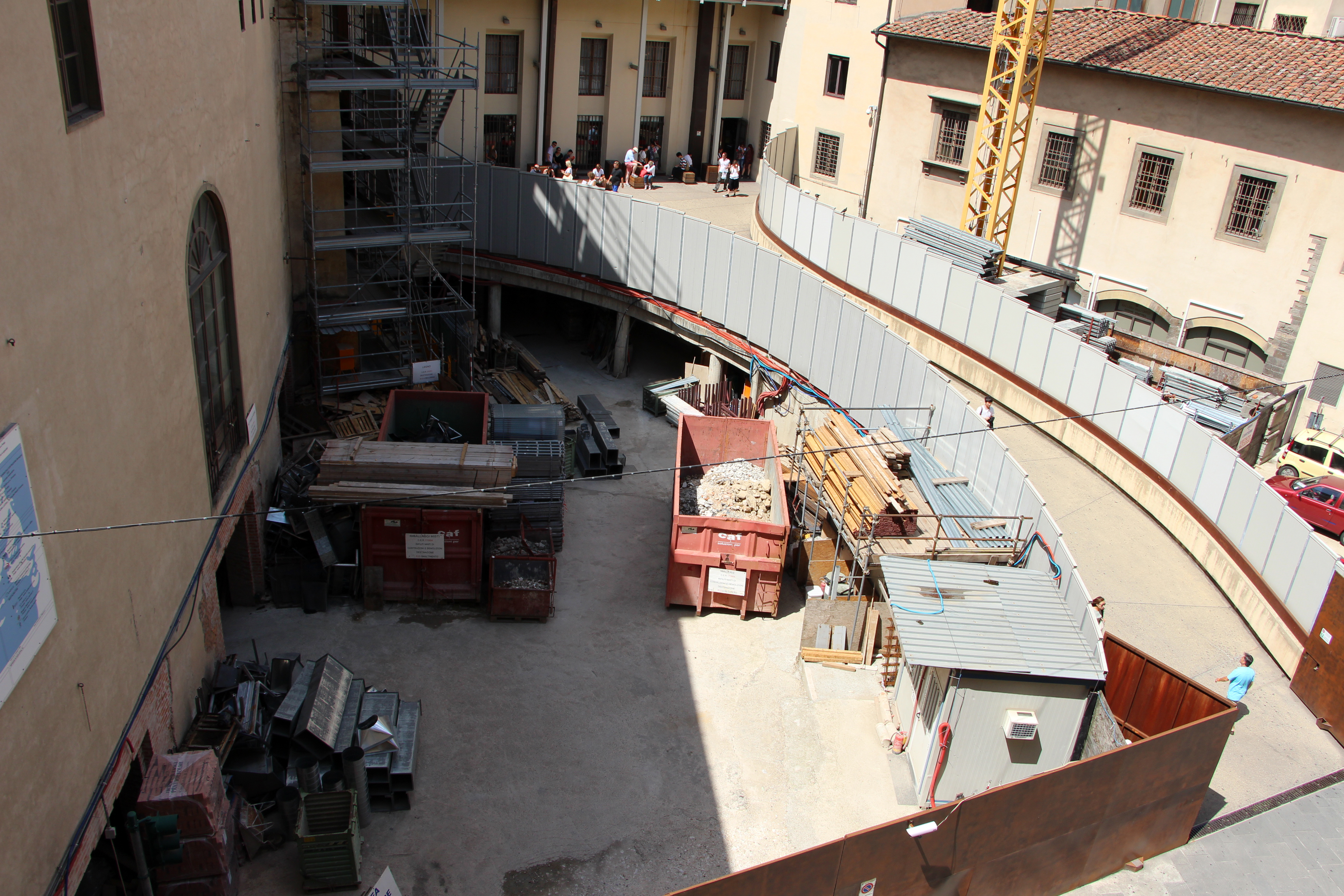
Works in the plaza area, 2013

The project for the new exit of the museum continues to be a sensitive subject for Florentines. The project has been at a stand-still since 2003 when it was originally intended to be unveiled. The debate over the loggia became both a political argument as well as an aesthetic one. Ruins below the Uffizi were discovered not long after excavations began which made the project even harder to realize due to strict preservation policies. Today, the debate continues to divide the city in two, those who support the project and those who stand against it. The new changes within the Uffizi building have made the realization of the modern loggia even less of a possibility; thus creating what the media has coined as a "cultural wound". However, even to this day appeals are continuously made by groups of architects, artists and art collectors to build the project, all in the hope of introducing a modern project amidst the grandiose historic buildings of Florence's core.
