= Nara Centennial Hall =

Nara Centennial Hall なら100年会館
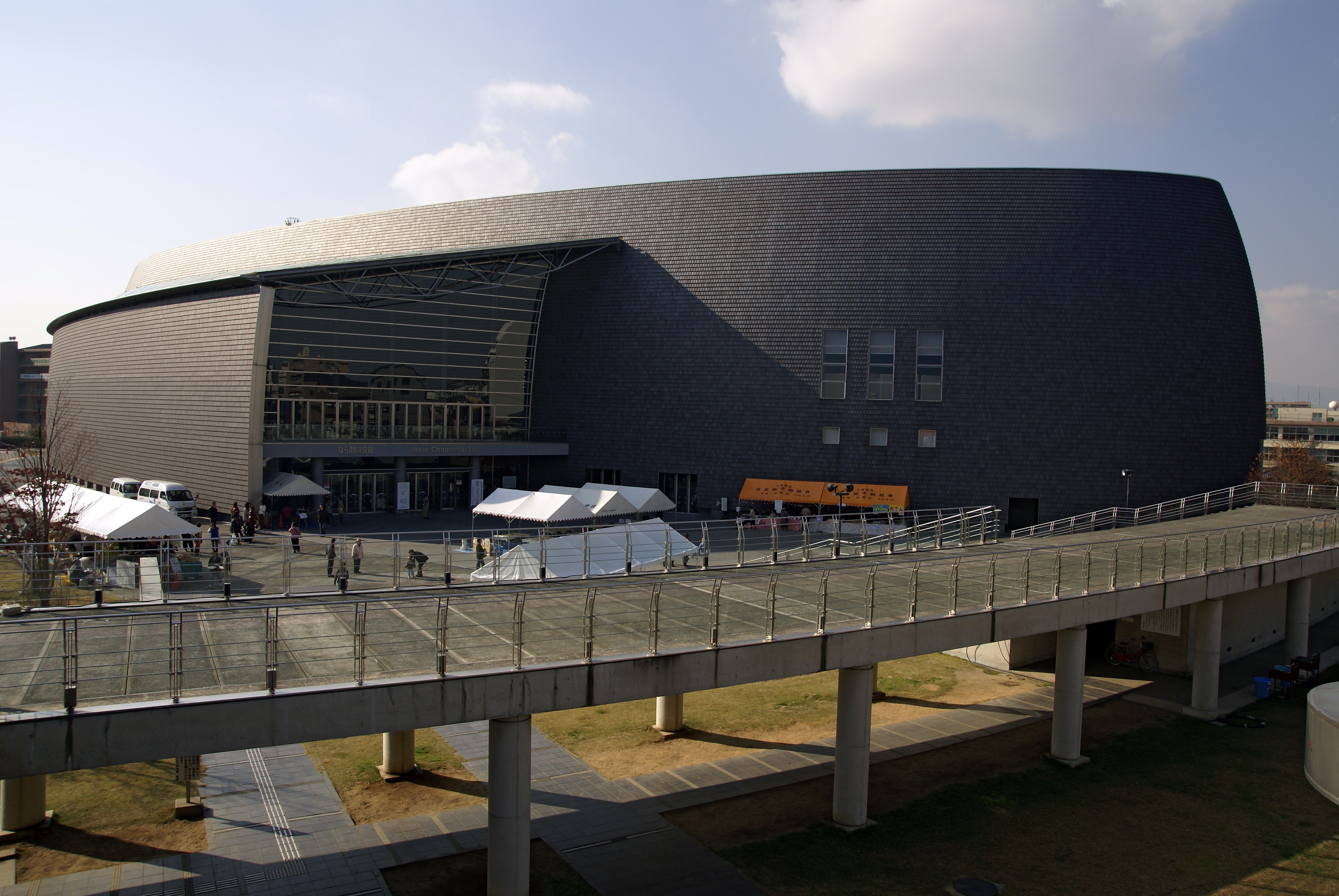
- Interactive map of the Nara Centennial Hall なら100年会館 area

General information
- Location: 7-1 Sanjōmiyamae, Nara, Japan
- Coordinates: 34°40′49″N 135°48′59″E
- Opened: February 1999
- Cost: ¥ 16,000 million (approx.)
- Owner: Nara City

Technical details
- Floor area: 22,682 m^{2}

Design and construction
- Architect: Arata Isozaki
- Other designers: Nagata Acoustics

Website
- Hompepage (Jp)

References
- Factsheet

Nara Centennial Hall (なら100年会館, Nara Hyakunen Kaikan) is a multi-use complex in Nara, Japan. It opened in 1999 as part of the centennial celebrations of the municipality of Nara. There is a large hall that seats up to 1720, a smaller concert hall with a capacity of 446, and a gallery. Arata Isozaki was the architect, with acoustical design by Nagata Acoustics.

== See also ==
- Historic Monuments of Ancient Nara
