= Arata Isozaki =

Japanese architect (1931–2022)

- 磯崎 新
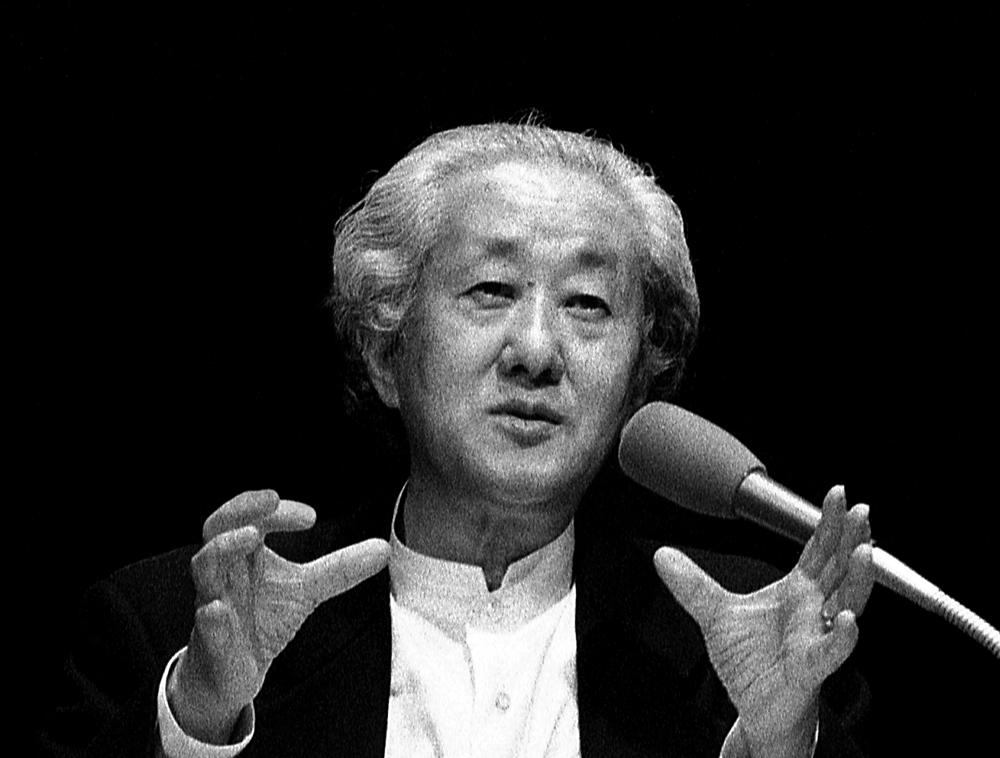
- Isozaki in 2013
- Born: 23 July 1931; Ōita, Japan
- Died: 28 December 2022 (aged 91); Naha, Okinawa Prefecture, Japan
- Education: University of Tokyo
- Occupation: Architect
- Spouse: Aiko Miyawaki (m. 1972; died 2014)
- Awards: 1986 Royal Gold Medal; 2019 Pritzker Prize
- Buildings: Festival Plaza at Expo '70; Art Tower Mito; Museum of Contemporary Art, Los Angeles

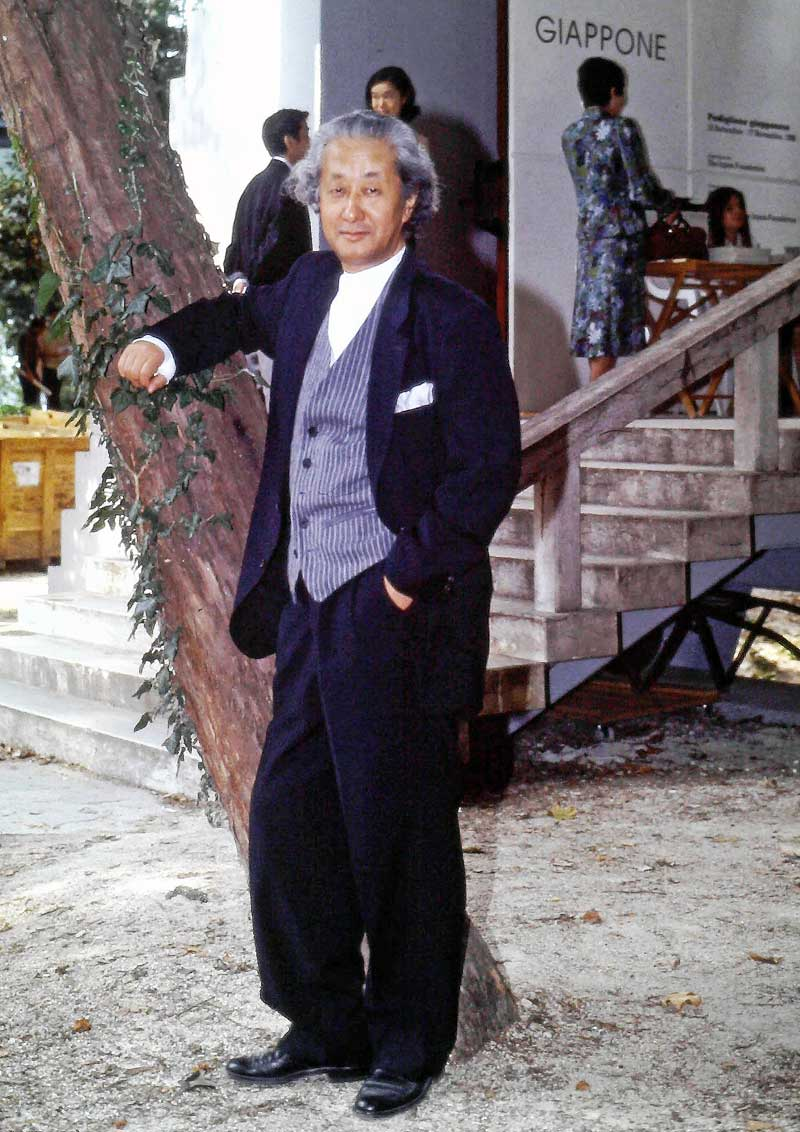
Arata Isozaki in 1996

Arata Isozaki (磯崎 新, Isozaki Arata; 23 July 1931 – 28 December 2022) was a Japanese architect, urban designer, and architectural theorist from Ōita. He was awarded the Royal Gold Medal in 1986 and the Pritzker Architecture Prize in 2019. He taught at Columbia University, Harvard University, and Yale University.

== Biography ==
Isozaki was born in Oita on the island of Kyushu and grew up in the era of postwar Japan, the eldest of four children of Toji and Tetsu Isozaki. His father was a prominent businessman. In 1945, he witnessed the destruction of Hiroshima on the shore opposite his hometown. When he accepted the Pritzker Prize in 2019 he stated: "There was no architecture, no buildings, and not even a city. So my first experience of architecture was the void of architecture, and I began to consider how people might rebuild their homes and cities."

Isozaki completed his schooling at the Oita Prefecture Oita Uenogaoka High School (erstwhile Oita Junior High School). In 1954, he graduated from the University of Tokyo majoring in Architecture and Engineering. He completed a doctoral program in architecture from the same university in 1961.

Isozaki was a student of Kenzo Tange's from 1952 to 1954, at which point he joined Tange's studio as an assistant and collaborator. He established his own firm, Arata Isozaki and Associates in 1963, though he continued to collaborate with Tange until 1975. Isozaki was asked to contribute to the original Metabolist manifesto, "Metabolism" (1960) though he declined. He is often associated with the movement, though his work came from a philosophical antithesis. In 1962 he published a critique of post-war urban growth. City Demolition Industry, Inc. is a surreal fiction from the perspective of an assassin who no longer takes pleasure in his job, since cities themselves so efficiently do his job for him. In spite of his refusal to participate in the initial 1960 manifesto, Isozaki later participated in the 1962 metabolist exhibition, "This Will Be Your City" in Tokyo.

Isozaki's early projects were influenced by European experiences with a style mixed between "New Brutalism" and "Metabolist Architecture" (Oita Medical Hall, 1959–1960), according to Reyner Banham. His style continued to evolve with buildings such as the Fujimi Country Club (1973–74) and Kitakyushu Central Library (1973–74). Later he developed a more modernistic style with buildings such as the Art Tower of Mito (1986–90) and Domus-Casa del Hombre (1991–1995) in Galicia, Spain. In 1983, he supported an apparently unbuildable entry for a sports club in Hong Kong by the then-unknown architect Zaha Hadid. In 1985 he designed the interior of New York City's Palladium nightclub. The Museum of Contemporary Art (MOCA) in Los Angeles, completed in 1986, was his second international project and his best known work in the U.S.

In 2005, Arata Isozaki founded the Italian branch of his office, Arata Isozaki & Andrea Maffei Associates. Two major projects from this office are the Allianz Tower CityLife office tower, a redevelopment project in the former trade fair area in Milan and the new Town Library in Maranello, Italy.

Despite designing buildings both inside and outside Japan, Isozaki was sometimes described as an architect who refused to be stuck in one architectural style, highlighting "how each of his designs is a specific solution born out of the project's context." Isozaki won the Pritzker Architecture Prize in 2019.

Isozaki died on 28 December 2022, at the age of 91.

== Awards ==
- Annual Prize, Architectural Institute of Japan in 1967 and 1975
- Mainichi Art Award in 1983
- RIBA Gold Medal in 1986
- International Award "Architecture in Stone" in 1987
- Arnold W. Brunner Memorial Prize of the American Academy and Institute of Arts and Letters in 1988
- Chicago Architecture Award in 1990
- Honor Award, the American Institute of Architects in 1992
- RIBA Honorary Fellow in 1994
- Golden Lion, 6 Venice Biennale of Architecture in 1996
- The European Cultural Centre (ECC) Architecture Award in 2012
- Lorenzo il Magnifico Lifetime Achievement Award in 2017
- Pritzker Prize in 2019

== Gallery ==
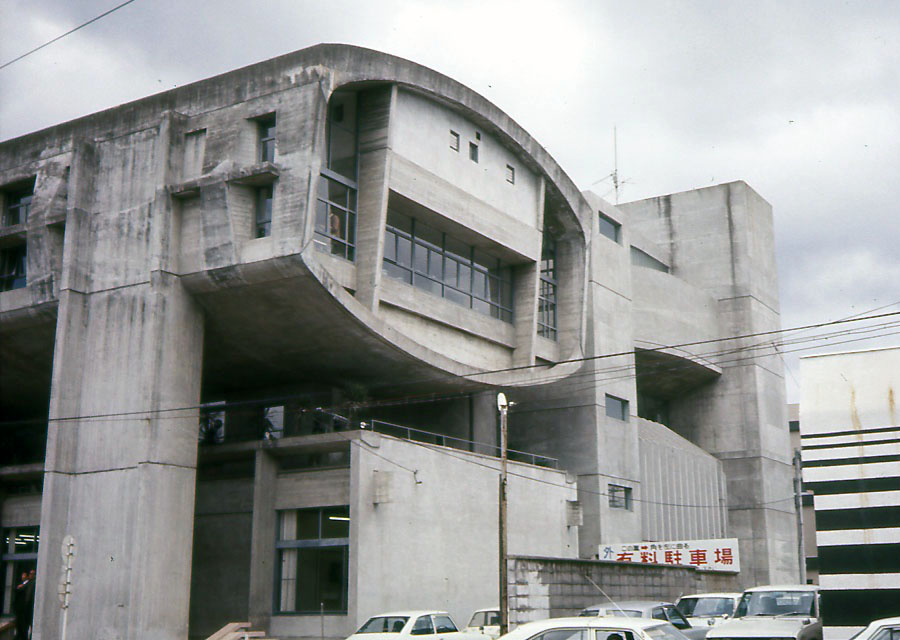
One of Isozaki's early projects, Oita Medical Hall (1959-1960), "mixed New Brutalism and Metabolist Architecture," according to one critic

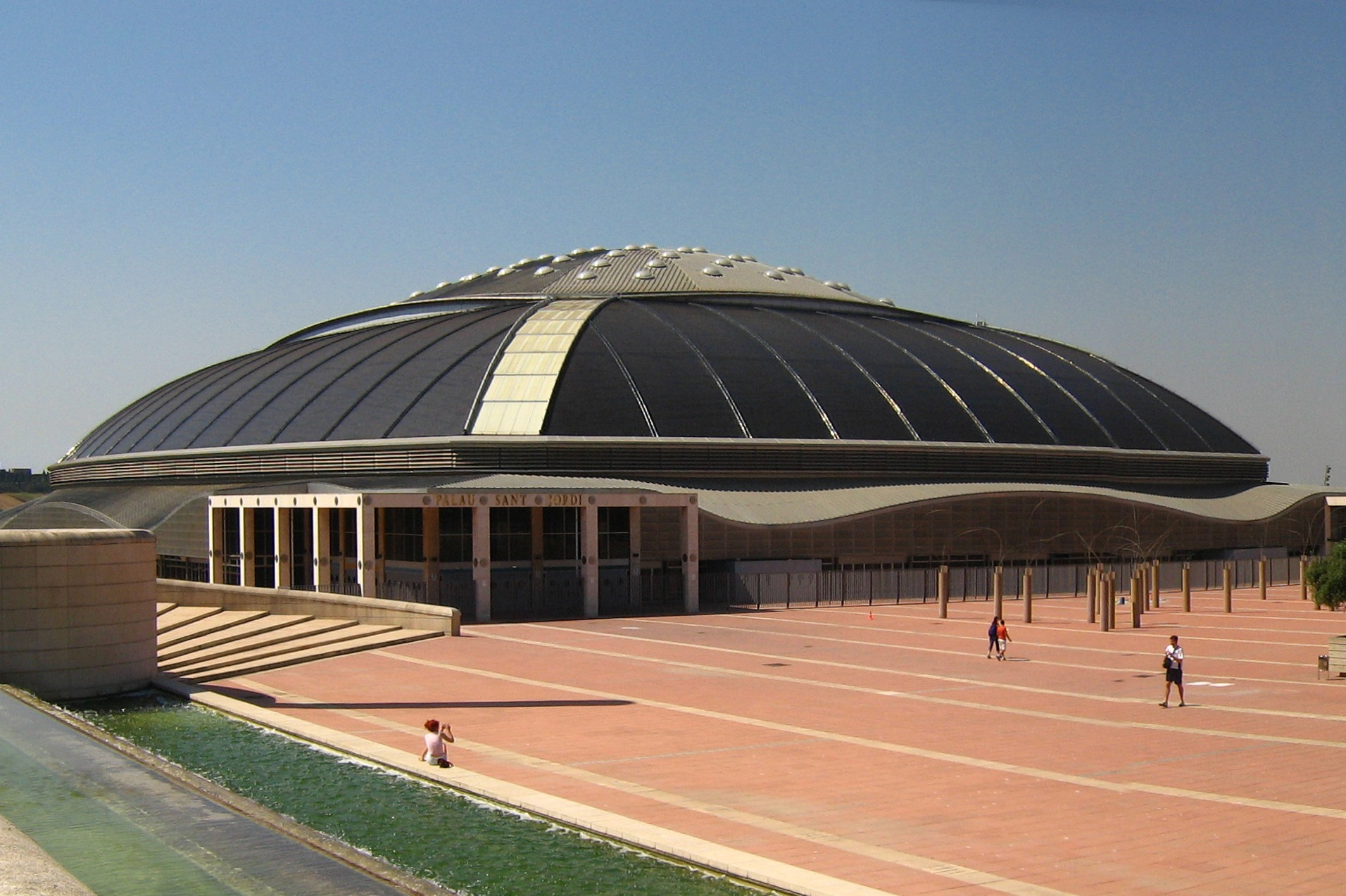
Palau Sant Jordi in Barcelona (1990)

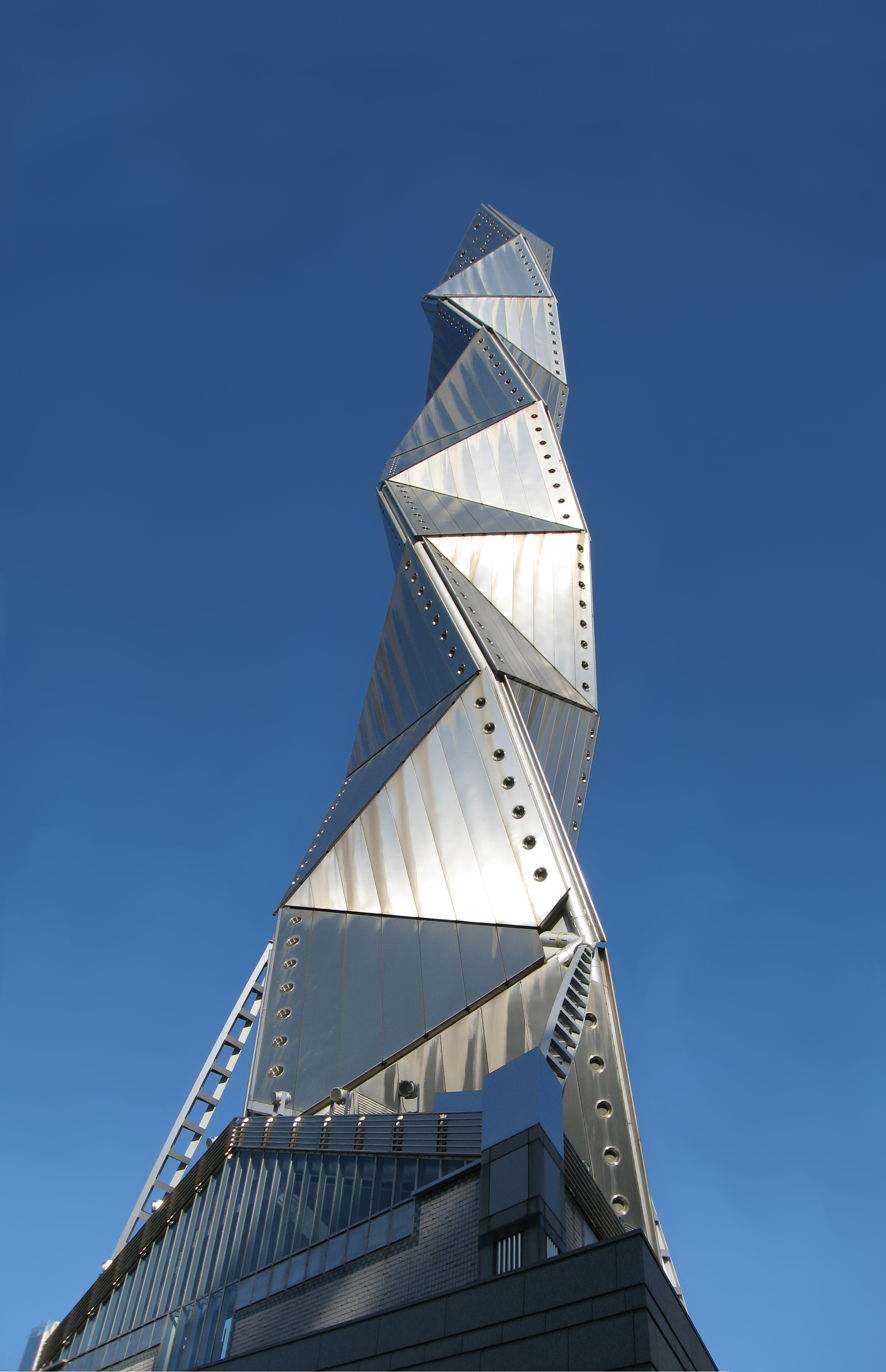
Art Tower Mito in Mito, Ibaraki (1990)

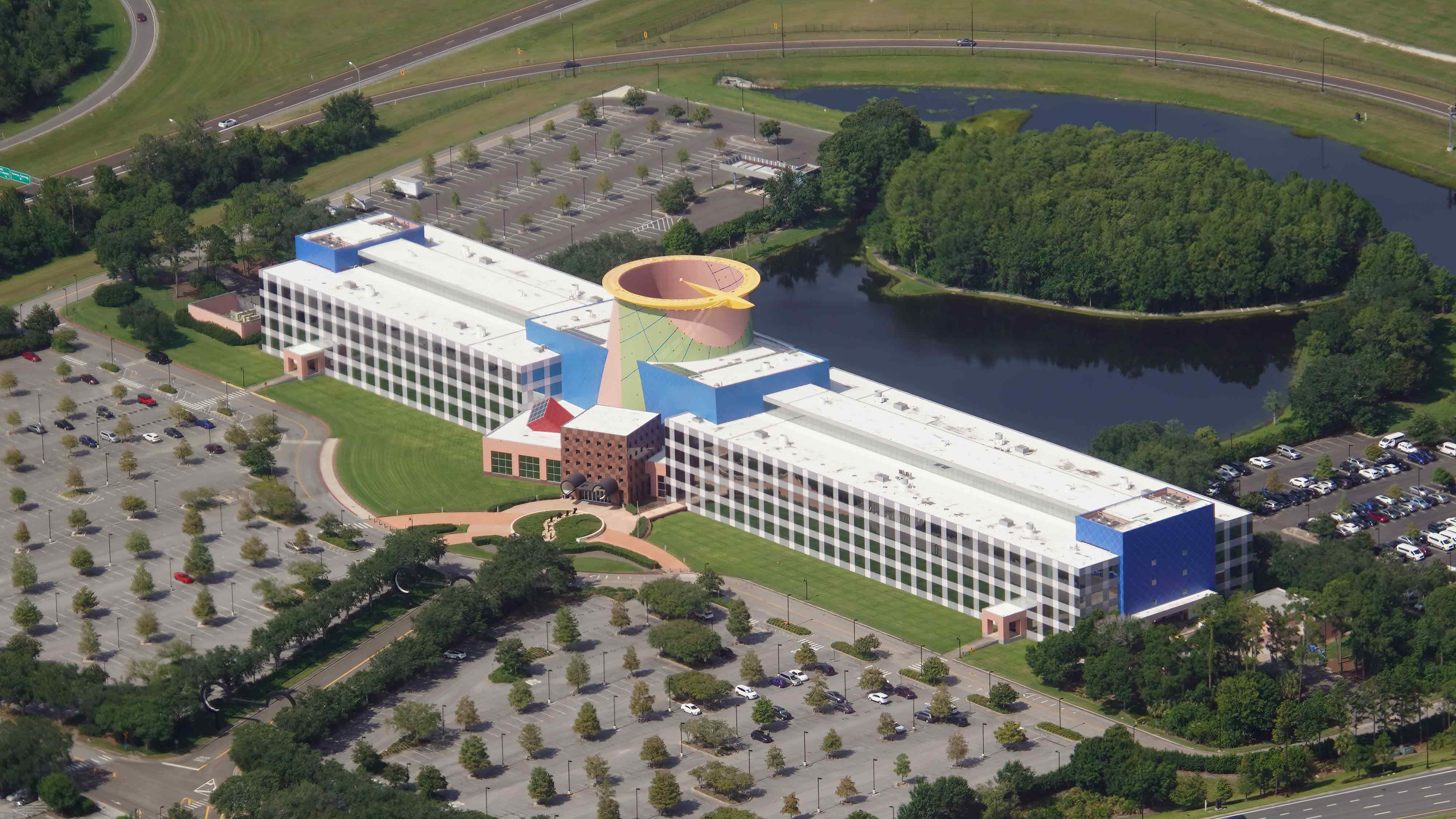
Team Disney Orlando (1992)

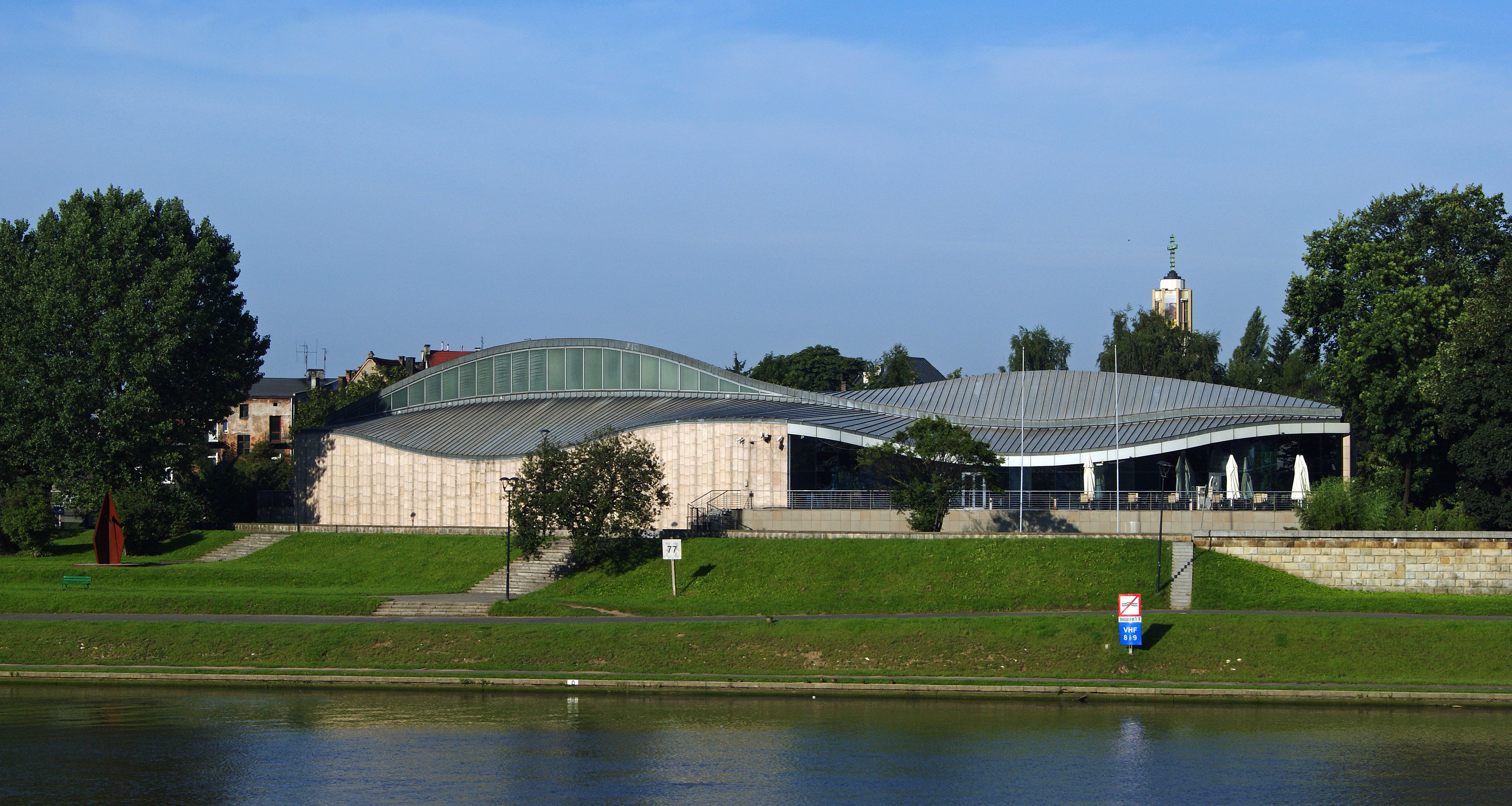
”Manggha” Museum of Japanese Art and Technology in Kraków (1994)

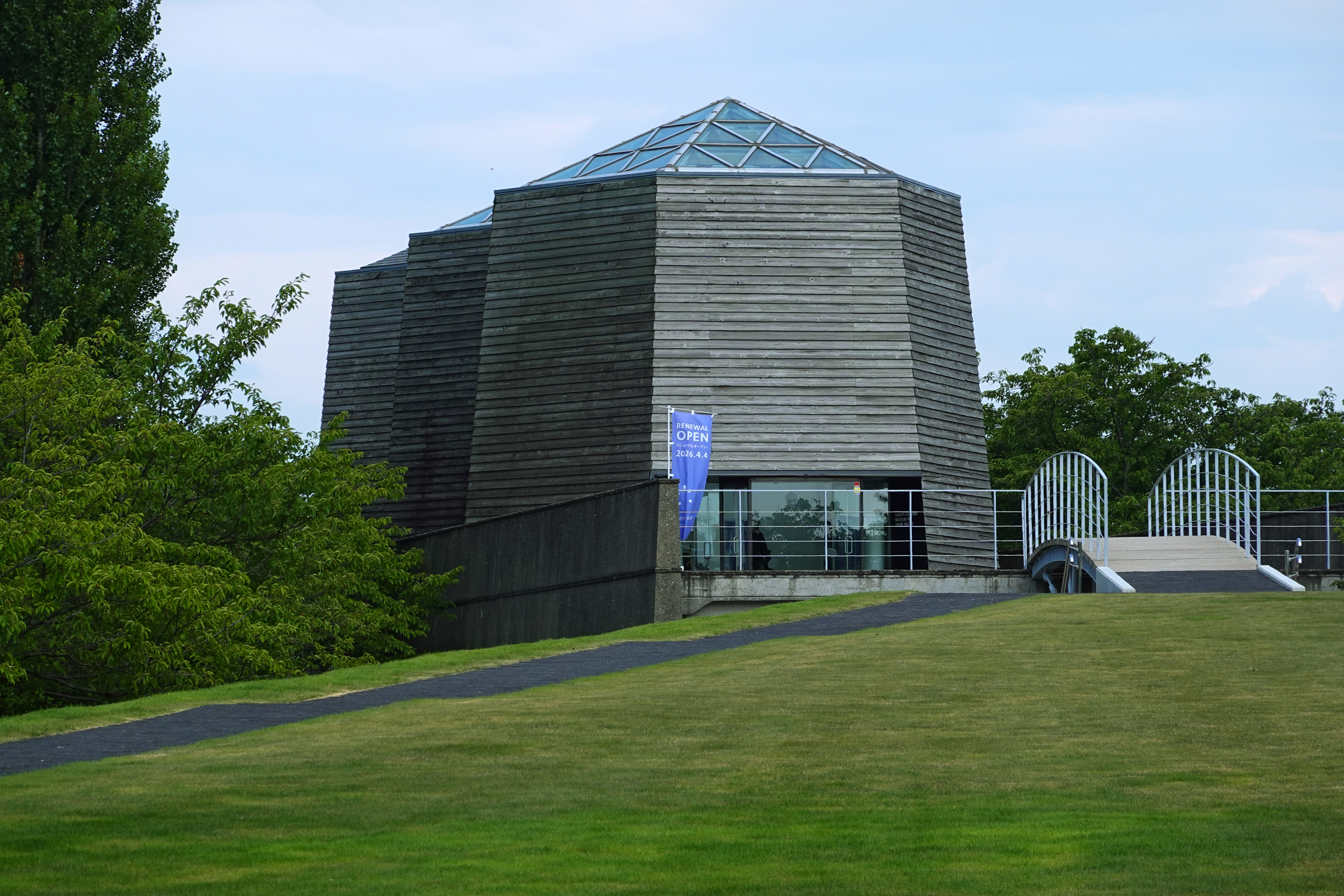
Nakaya Ukichiro Museum of Snow and Ice in Kaga, Ishikawa (1994)

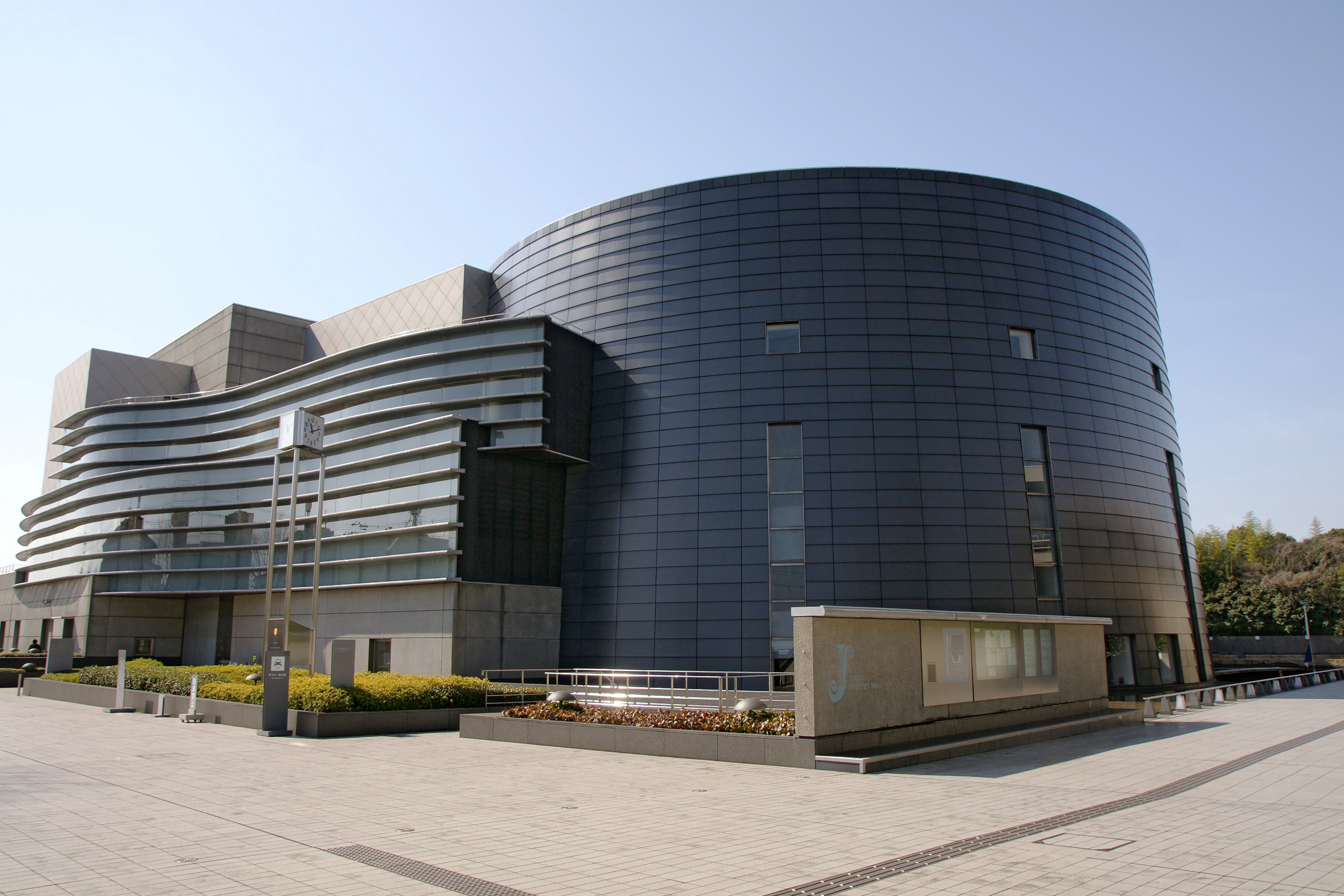
Kyoto Concert Hall (1995)

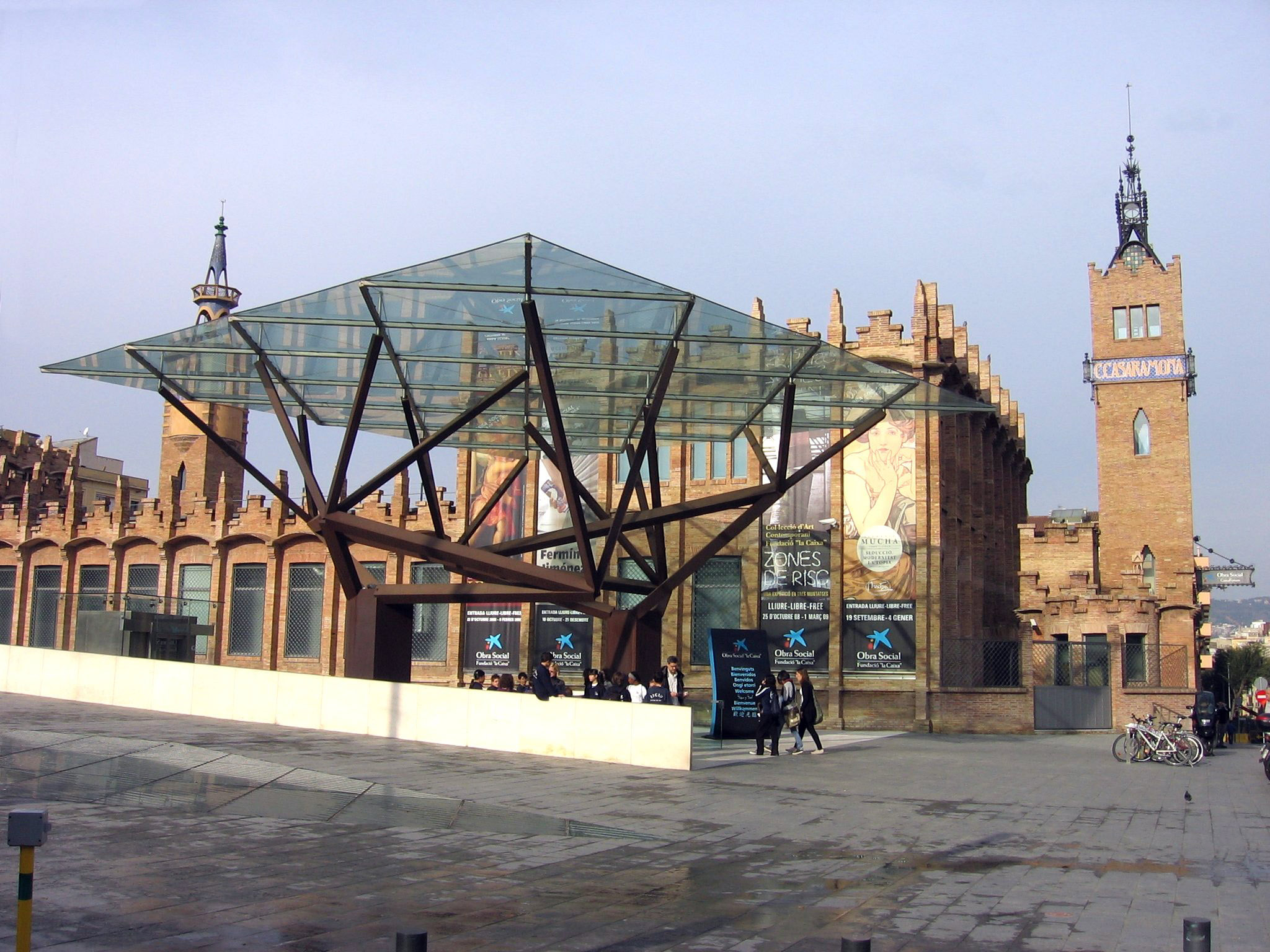
Entrance to CaixaForum Barcelona (2001)

Qatar National Convention Centre (2011)

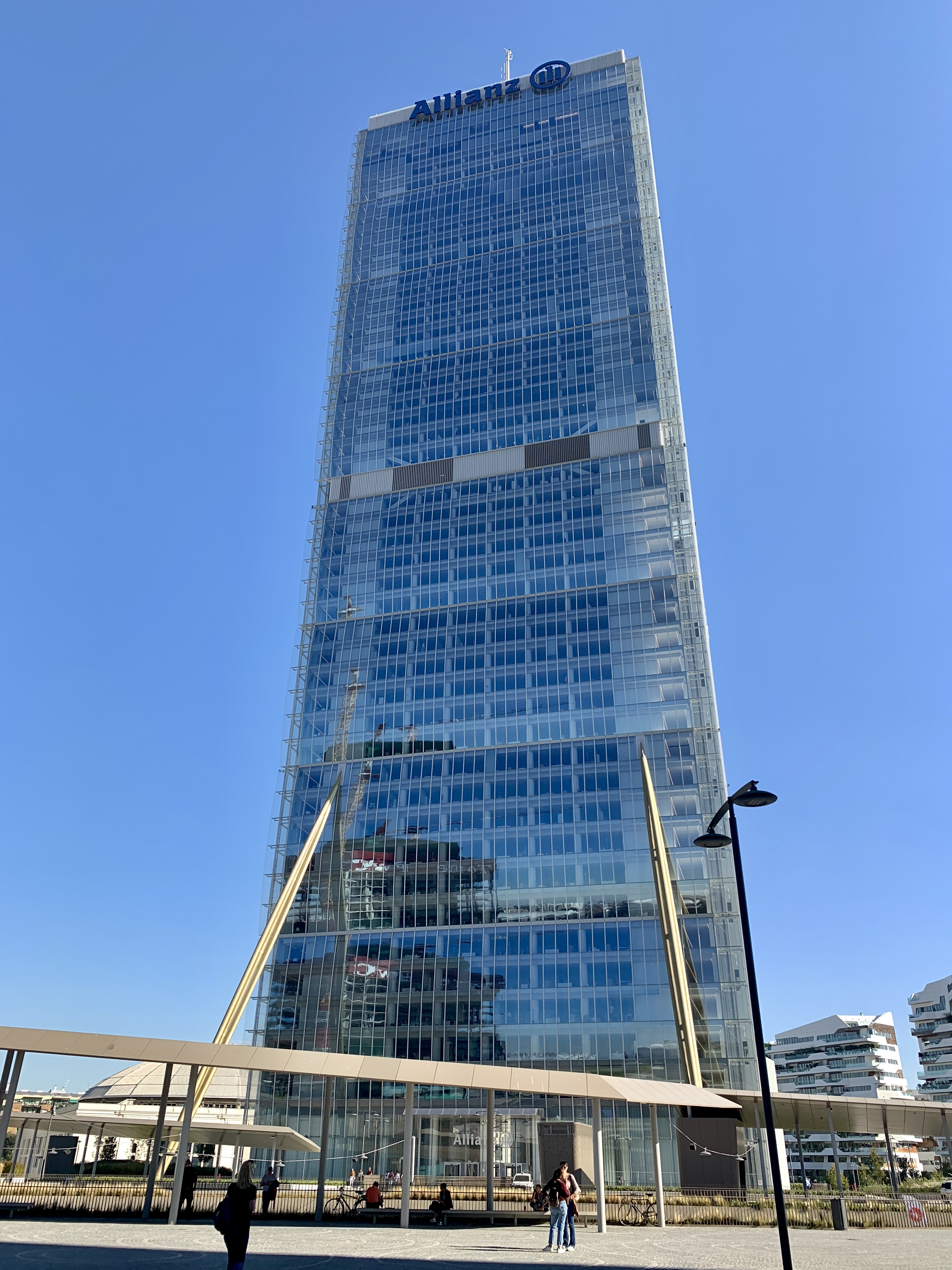
Allianz Tower in Milan (2015)

== Notable works ==
- Ōita Prefectural Library, (1962–1966) Ōita, Ōita, Japan
- Kitakyushu Municipal Museum of Art (1972–1974) in Fukuoka, Japan
- Kitakyushu Central Library (1973–1974) in Fukuoka, Japan
- Museum of Modern Art, Gunma (1974) in Takasaki, Japan
- Museum of Contemporary Art (MOCA), (1981–1986) Los Angeles, California, United States
- Palau Sant Jordi main indoor venue during the 1992 Summer Olympics, (1983–1990) Barcelona, Spain
- Ochanomizu Square Building – Casals Hall, (1984–1987) Tokyo, Japan
- Palladium nightclub building interior (1985) in New York City, United States
- Lake Sagami Country Clubhouse (1987–1989), with stained glass skylights and lantern by Brian Clarke, Yamanishi, Japan
- Art Tower Mito, Mito, (1986–1990) Ibaraki, Japan
- Team Disney Orlando, (1987–1990) Florida, United States
- Bond University, – Library, Administration Building, Faculty of Humanities Building (1987–1989) Gold Coast, Australia
- KitaKyushu International Conference Center (1987–1990) Fukuoka, Japan
- Palafolls Sports Complex Pavilion, (1987–1996) Barcelona, Spain
- Centre of Japanese Art and Technology, (1990–1994) Kraków, Poland
- Nagi Museum Of Contemporary Art, (1991–1994) Okayama, Japan
- Kyoto Concert Hall, (1991–1995) Kyoto, Japan
- Nara Centennial Hall, (1992–1998) Nara, Japan
- Team Disney Orlando, (1992) Lake Buena Vista, Florida, United States
- Domus: La Casa del Hombre, (1993–1995) A Coruña, Spain
- Shizuoka Performing Arts Center (SPAC), (1993–1998) Shizuoka, Japan, opened 1999 for the second Theatre Olympics
- COSI Columbus, (1994–1999) Columbus, Ohio, United States
- Municipal Daycare and Hospital Complex (1997－1998) Tokyo, Japan
- Shenzhen Cultural Center, (1998–2007) Shenzhen, China
  - Includes Shenzhen Library and Shenzhen Concert Hall
- New entrance of the CaixaForum Barcelona building, (1999–2002) Barcelona, Spain
- Isozaki Atea, (1999–2009) Bilbao, Spain
- Torino Palasport Olimpico, (2000–2006) Turin, Italy
- Museum of the Central Academy of Fine Arts in Beijing, (2003–2008) China
- New Concert Hall Building, (2003–) Thessaloniki, Greece, 2010
- Himalayas Center, (2003–) Shanghai, China
- Pavilion of Japanese Army in World War II, Jianchuan Museum Cluster, (2004–2015) Chengdu, China
- Diamond Island, (2006–) Ho Chi Minh City, Vietnam (complete in 2012)
- Coliseum da Coruña, A Coruña, Galicia, Spain, 1991
- Weill Cornell Medical College in Qatar, Education City, near Doha
- Zhengzhou Financial Island, (2011- ) Henan, China
- Qatar National Convention Center, opened 2011
- New Town Library (2012) in Maranello, Italy (Arata Isozaki and Andrea Maffei)
- D38 Office (2012) in Barcelona, Spain
- Allianz Tower (Il Dritto) (2015), in Milan, Italy (Arata Isozaki and Andrea Maffei)
- Harbin Concert Hall (2015), in Harbin, China

== Last projects ==
- The University of Central Asia's three campuses in Tekeli, Kazakhstan; Naryn, the Kyrgyz Republic; and Khorog, Tajikistan
- The New exit for the Uffizi Gallery, Florence, Italy – competition winner (Arata Isozaki and Andrea Maffei)
- The renovation of the Bologna Centrale railway station, Bologna, Italy – competition winner
- Metropolis Thao Dien, Ho Chi Minh City, Vietnam
