= Literature by Galician authors =

The literature written by Galician authors has been developed in both Galician language literature and Spanish literature. The earliest works written in Galician language are from the early 13th-century trovadorismo tradition. In the Middle Ages, Galego-português (Galician-Portuguese) was a language of culture, poetry (troubadours) and religion throughout not only Galicia and Portugal but also Castile.

After the separation of Portuguese and Galician, Galician was considered provincial and was not widely used for literary or academic purposes. It was with the Rexurdimento ("Rebirth"), in the mid-19th century that Galician was used again in literature, and then in politics.

== Authors ==
=== Main authors in both Galician and Spanish ===
- Alfonso X of Castile
- Rosalía de Castro
- Ledicia Costas
- Filomena Dato
- Padre Feijoo
- Manuel Murguía
- Manuel Rivas
- Álvaro Cunqueiro
- Manuel Curros Enríquez
- Rosa Méndez Fonte
- Eduardo Pondal
- Ofelia Rey Castelao
- Vicente Risco
- Xohán Vicente Viqueira
- Xesús Ferro Couselo
- Aurelio Aguirre Galarraga
- Celso Emilio Ferreiro
- Rafael Dieste
- Francisco Añón
- Eduardo Blanco Amor

=== Main authors in Galician ===
- Mendinho
- Clara Corral Aller
- Xurxo Borrazás
- Martín Codax
- Alfonso Daniel Rodríguez Castelao
- Fermín Bouza Brei
- Carlos Casares Mouriño
- Suso de Toro
- Xosé Neira Vilas
- Padre Sarmiento
- Antón Vilar Ponte
- Luís Seoane
- Dario Xoan Cabana
- Xohán de Cangas
- Ánxel Fole
- Marilar Aleixandre
- María Xosé Queizán
- Xohana Torres
- Luísa Villalta
- Chus Pato
- María do Cebreiro
- Estíbaliz Espinosa
- Berta Dávila
- Olga Novo
- Ismael Ramos
- Gonzalo Hermo

For a more extensive list of Galician language writers, see Día das Letras Galegas.

=== Main authors in Spanish ===
- Ramón del Valle-Inclán
- Camilo José Cela (Nobel Prize for Literature, 1989)
- Emilia Pardo Bazán
- Concepción Arenal
- Gonzalo Torrente Ballester
- Wenceslao Fernández Flórez
- Benito Vicetto Pérez
- Nicomedes Pastor Díaz
- Jacinto Salas y Quiroga
- Juan Bautista Alonso
- Blanca Andreu
- Antonio Francisco de Castro e Iglesias

=== Other authors ===
- Ignacio Ramonet - works in Spanish and French
- Federico García Lorca - the poet from Granada, wrote "Six Galician Poems" in Galician language

== See also ==
- Galician language literature

== Sources ==
- Márquez, Francisco (1995), "Vita: Alfonso X", Harvard Magazine, Jan.-Feb.: 54
- Procter, Evelyn S. (1951), Alfonso X of Castile: Patron of Literature and Learning, Oxford: Clarendon Press
