= Galician literature =

Galician-language literature is the literature written in Galician. The earliest works in Galician language are from the early 13th-century trovadorismo tradition. In the Middle Ages, Galego-português (Galician-Portuguese) was a language of culture, poetry (troubadours) and religion throughout not only Galicia and Portugal but also in the Castile-León region.

After the separation of Portuguese and Galician, Galician was considered provincial and was not widely used for literary or academic purposes. It was with the Rexurdimento ("Rebirth"), in the mid-19th century that Galician was used again in literature, and then in politics.

Much literature by Galician authors is written in Spanish, such as by Ignacio Ramonet or Gonzalo Torrente Ballester - though such writers tend to be excluded from discussion of Galician literature and counted as Spanish-language literature.

Rosalia Castro de Murguía's Cantares Gallegos (1863; Galician Songs) was the first Galician-language book to be published in four centuries. Related to literature, Chano Piñeiro's 1989 Sempre Xonxa is regarded as the first Galician-language film. The intellectual group Xeración Nós, a name that alludes to the Irish Sinn Féin ("We Ourselves") promoted Galician culture in the 1920s. Xeración Galaxia was established to translate modern texts that would link an independent Galician culture with the European context. The Galician translation of the Bible was begun in 1968 by Editorial SEPT and published in 1989.

== Notable people ==
=== Main authors ===
==== Middle Ages ====
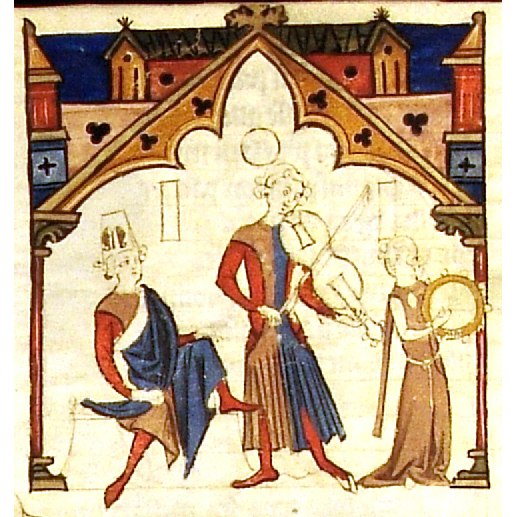
Troubadours in a miniature in the Cancionero da Ajuda (13th century)

- Alfonso X of Castile
- Xohán de Cangas
- Martín Codax
- Mendinho

==== Dark Centuries ====
- Padre Sarmiento

==== 19th century ====
- Rosalía de Castro
- Manuel Murguía
- Francisco Añón
- Manuel Curros Enríquez
- Eduardo Pondal

==== 20th century ====
- Álvaro Cunqueiro
- Vicente Risco
- Xohán Vicente Viqueira
- Evaristo Martelo Paumán
- Xesús Ferro Couselo
- Celso Emilio Ferreiro (exiled in Venezuela)
- Rafael Dieste
- Eduardo Blanco Amor
- Alfonso Daniel Rodríguez Castelao (exiled in Argentina)
- Fermín Bouza Brei
- Carlos Casares Mouriño
- Xosé Neira Vilas (exiled in Cuba)
- Antón Vilar Ponte
- Luís Seoane (born in Argentina and exiled there and in Mexico)
- Dario Xoan Cabana
- Silvio Santiago (exiled in Venezuela)
- Ánxel Fole
- Manuel Rodriguez Lopez

==== Contemporary ====
- Ledicia Costas
- Manuel Rivas
- Suso de Toro
- Xurxo Borrazás
- Teresa Moure
- Xosé Ramón Pena
- Xosé Luís Méndez Ferrín
- Pilar Pallarés
- Marilar Aleixandre
- Ana Romaní
- Olga Novo
- Estíbaliz Espinosa
- Berta Dávila
- María do Cebreiro
- Chus Pato
- Ismael Ramos

For a more extensive list of Galician-language writers, see Día das Letras Galegas

=== Other authors ===
- Federico García Lorca. The poet from Granada wrote "Six Galician Poems" in Galician language.

== See also ==
- Día das Letras Galegas ("Galician Literature Day") on May 17
