= Language policies of Francoist Spain =

Dictatorial establishment of a single official language

Francoist propaganda graffiti in Catalonia: "If you are Spanish, speak Spanish."

During the dictatorship of Francisco Franco from 1939 to 1975, language policies were implemented in an attempt to increase the dominance of the Spanish language over the other languages of Spain. Franco's regime had Spanish nationalism as its main ideological base. Under his dictatorship, the Spanish language was declared Spain's only official language.

The use of other languages in the administration was either banned, discouraged or frowned upon depending on the particular circumstances and timing, while the use of names in other languages for newborns was forbidden in 1938, except for foreigners.

The situation evolved from the harshest years of the immediate afterward (especially the 1940s, also the 1950s) to the relative tolerance of the last years (late 1960s and early 1970s); Franco died in 1975, and his successor Juan Carlos of Spain began the Spanish transition to democracy.

== Background ==
=== Regional nationalism ===
In Basque, Catalan, and Galician nationalism in the early 20th century, language was a central topic and defined both groups national identities, specifically the Basque, Catalan, and Galician languages, respectively. Language was more stressed in Catalan and Galician nationalism than Basque nationalism, however, which preferred to stress race and ethnicity over language. Catalan and Galician nationalist communities taught their language and culture to immigrant communities in an effort to assimilate them and preserve their national identity, while Basque nationalists were more opposed to immigration in general.

In politics, Basque, Catalan, and Galician politicians preferred to speak their native language over Spanish to differentiate themselves from Spanish politicians. In 1932, the Statute of Autonomy of Catalonia of 1932 was implemented and made Catalan the co-official language of Catalonia, together with Spanish. The Statute of Autonomy of the Basque Country of 1936 established Basque as the co-official language of the Basque Country, together with Spanish. Similarly, the Statute of Autonomy of Galicia of 1936 established Galician as the co-official language of Galicia, together with Spanish.

== The Spanish language ==
As part of the nationalistic efforts:

- Spanish films were produced only in Spanish. All foreign films were required to be dubbed, and all films originally produced in the languages of autonomous communities were required to be re-issued in Spanish. The dubbing helped the censorship of unacceptable dialogue.
- Spanish names and Spanish versions of Catholic and classical names were the only ones allowed. Leftist names like Lenín and regional names like even the Catalan Jordi (after Catalonia's patron saint, Saint George) were forbidden and even forcibly replaced in official records. Only Christian names in Spanish were allowed in official documents.
- The Spanish language, to the exclusion of others, was used in schools and public services. Teachers that taught local languages were punished.

In the first decade of Franco's rule, languages other than Spanish were "confined to private spaces".

In the regime's most radical discourse, languages other than Spanish were often considered "dialects" in the sense of speeches that were not developed enough to be "real languages". Basque was different enough that it could not be taken as a debased form of Spanish but was despised as a rural language of limited currency, unfit for modern discourse. This never happened at the academic level, though.

All these policies became less strict and more permissive as time passed. Regional languages began to be used in festivals.

== Evolution ==
The Press Law of Manuel Fraga Iribarne replaced the pre-publication censorship with after-the-fact punishments.

== Situation by area ==
Language policies were imposed in regions across Spain. Most notably, several sporting organizations—including FC Barcelona and Athletic Bilbao, among others—were forced to change their names from the local language to Spanish. Additionally, the other languages of Spain were censored in print.

=== Aragon ===
- Aragonese language

=== Asturias ===
- Asturleonese language

=== Balearic Islands ===
- Catalan language

=== Basque Country ===
- Basque language
- The Catholic Church had supported the Basque nationalists aligned with the Republic.
- Creation of Standard Basque by Euskaltzaindia
- Unofficial Basque-language schools (ikastola).

=== Catalonia ===
- Catalan language
- Salvador Espriu
- Joan Manuel Serrat was not allowed to sing La La La in Catalan for the Eurovision Song Contest 1968 since it was forbidden to sing in non-official languages from 1966 to 1973 in the contest and, unwilling to sing it in Spanish, was replaced by Massiel, who won the contest.

=== Galicia ===
- Galician language
- The exiles and emigrants in Buenos Aires took a great role in Galician literature.
- The nationalist resistance in Spain, in partnership with those who were exiled abroad, denounced the repression, censorship and veto of the Francoist regime regarding the public use and printing in Galician language (for example, forbidding the publishing of a translation of Martin Heidegger) and other Spanish languages. The protest was taken before the VIII UNESCO Conference at Montevideo in 1954 (when Spain was about to be admitted, and where the Montevideo Resolution was taken), with a 32-page text called Denuncia da perseguizón do idioma galego pol-o Estado Hespañol ("Denouncement of the persecution against the Galician language by the Spanish State"), written by Ramón Piñeiro López and distributed to the audience in Galician, English and French. The action was discussed in the book A batalla de Montevideo ("The Montevideo battle") by Alonso Montero and reactivated in claims in the present day.

=== León ===
- Asturleonese language

=== Spanish Guinea ===
- Pichinglis
- Fernando Poo
- Río Muni
- History of Equatorial Guinea
- Annobonese language (Fá d'Ambô)

=== Navarre ===
CA Osasuna was allowed to maintain its Basque name, unlike other football teams with non-Spanish names.

=== Spanish North Africa ===
- Ceuta, Melilla, Spanish Morocco, Spanish Sahara, international Tangier

=== Valencian Community ===
- Valencian language

== Caló ==
- Caló (Spanish Romani)

== See also ==
- Language policy in France
- Language politics
- If you're Spanish, speak Spanish!
- Anti-Catalan sentiment
