= Federación de Mocedades Galeguistas =

Federación de Mocedades Galeguistas Galicianist Youth Federation
- Founded: 1934
- Headquarters: Ourense, Galicia
- Ideology: Galician nationalism Republicanism; Direct democracy Anti-imperialism; Antifascism Internal factions: Social liberalism; Political Catholicism; Socialism; Galician independence
- Mother party: Partido Galeguista

The Federación de Mocedades Galeguistas (FMG, Galicianist Youth Federation or Galician Nationalist Youth Federation in English language) was the youth organization of the Partido Galeguista, which was formed in January 1934, bringing together the different local nationalist youth organizations that had been formed since 1932. It had around 1,000 members, its official organ was the Guieiro (Guide in English language), and their leaders were Xaime Illa Couto, Celso Emilio Ferreiro, Xosé Velo and Ramón Piñeiro López.

== "Independentism" ==
Within the FMG, advocacy of Galician independence had much more acceptance that in the Partido Galeguista (PG) itself, and thus in their III Assembly (May 1936) 331 members voted to adopt "independentism" as their official ideology while 439 voted against the proposal.

== History ==
The local Mocedades Galeguistas were linked to the local party groups of the PG, but barely maintained contact with each other. It was Xaime Illa Couto, the secretary general of the Mocedade Galeguista of Vigo, the first person that appealed to create a Union of the Mocedades Galeguistas. His writing appeared in September 1933 and was published in A Nosa Terra. The appeal soon received support the rest of the Mocedades Galeguistas spread across the country. The formal constitution coincided with the III Assembly of the PG in Ourense, on January 13, 1934.

The first Assembly was held in May in Ourense, Francisco Fernández del Riego was chosen Secretary General of the new organization. Xaime Illa Couto, Xosé Luís Fontenla Méndez and Xoán Lois Ramos Colemán completed the Executive Secretariat. The II General Assembly was also held in Ourense in April 1935. Xosé Velo became the general secretary. Celso Emilio Ferreiro, Vicente Bóveda and Xosé Nogueiras completed the board of the organization. In 1935 the biggest act of the organization was held in Celanova, attended by more than 4,000 people. In the III Assembly, held in May 1936, new Statutes were approved. In that assembly it was also decided to rename the organization, that was finally renamed Federación de Mocedades Nacionalistas (Federation of Nationalist Youth in English language). After the Francoist early victory in Galiza, the organization was dissolved. The exiled branches of the organization, especially the Buenos Aires one, continued to work until the 60s.

== Structure ==
The highest body of FMG was the General Assembly (called the National Assembly in the new Statutes of 1936), which was held every year, and that was responsible for drawing up the program of the organization and elec the members of the National Council, which was the body responsible for executing the resolutions of the General Assembly, also which had the power to designate the FMG representative in the Council of the PG. The Executive was the governing body of the FMG, consisted of four secretaries: Secretary General, Organization Secretary, Technical Secretary and Secretary of Propaganda. In the Statutes of 1936 the National Council executive secretary was united in one body, the National Executive Council made up of seven general secretaries of each of the areas in which the FMG divided Galiza.

== See also ==
- Galician Statute of Autonomy (1936)
- Partido Galeguista
- Celso Emilio Ferreiro
- Galicia
- Galician nationalism
- History of Galicia
