= Gatipedro =

Galician legendary creature

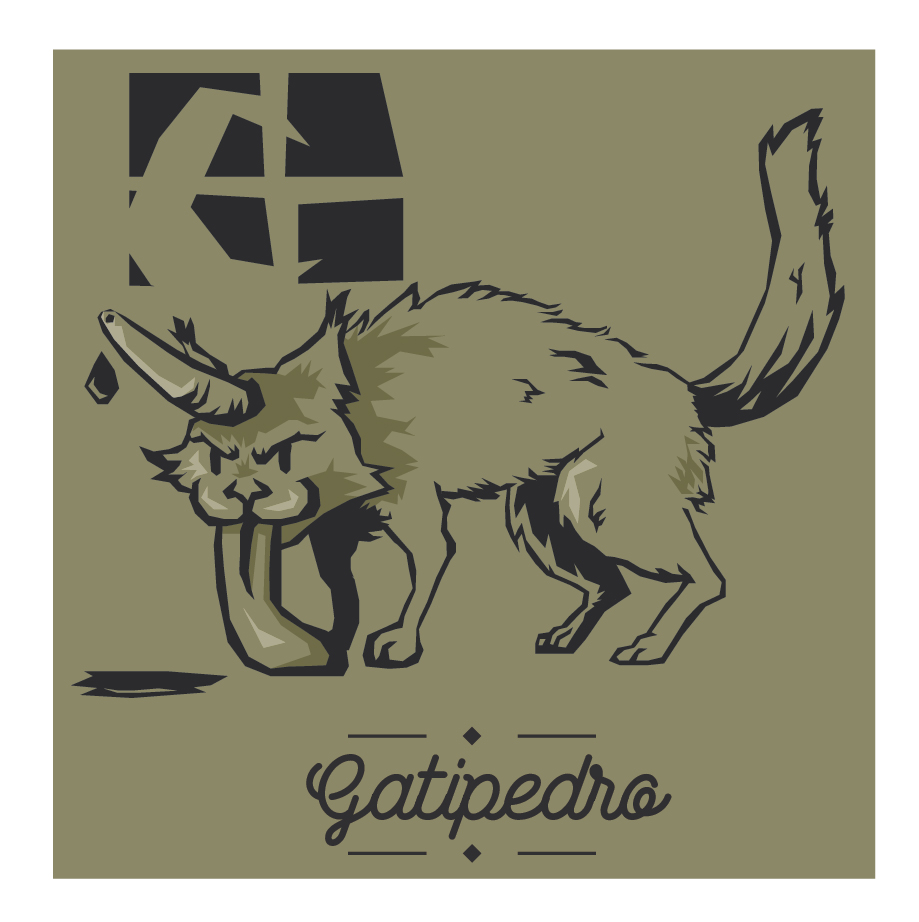
Picture of the gatipedro, Galician mythological being.

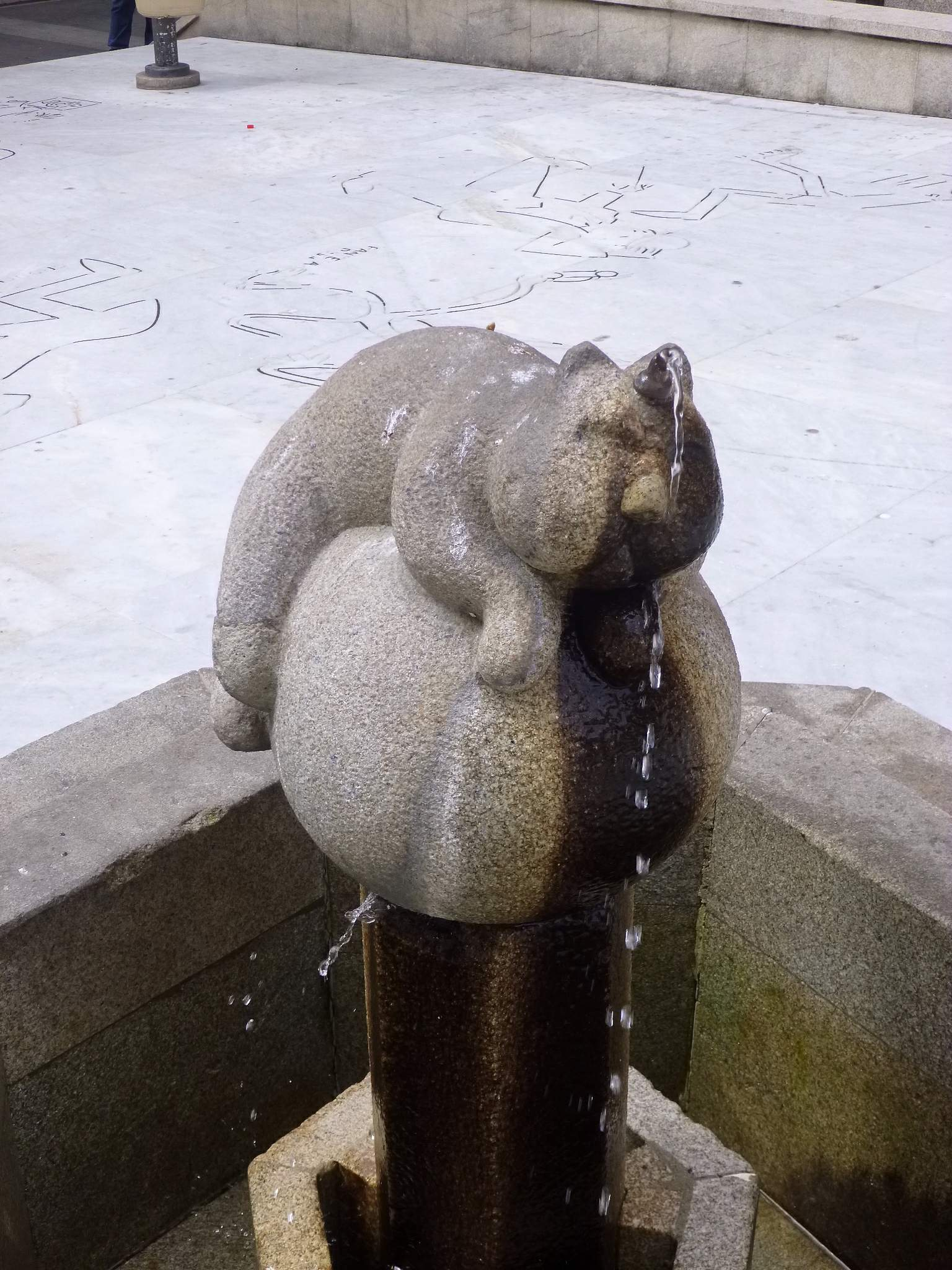
Sculpture of the gatipedro in praza do Humor, A Coruña.

The gatipedro is a legendary creature in Galician folklore, who makes children wet their beds. It is portrayed as a white cat with a single brown horn on its head. At night, it enters houses, goes to children's bedrooms and pours water through its horn. The sleeping child dreams he or she is peeing, and so actually wets the bed. According to popular tradition, it can be scared away by salt grains at a room's door and beside the window. It walks on all fours as well as its tongue, so when it tastes the salt, it turns around and leaves the kids alone.

The gatipedro was described by Galician author Álvaro Cunqueiro in his book Escola de menciñeiros, originally published by Editorial Galaxia in 1960. It is also one of the themes of the short story collection "Os outros feirantes," written in 1971 by Cunqueiro, where the character Marcelino pees in his bed because of the nocturnal visits of this animal. Finally, the situation is resolved thanks to a healer or "menciñeiro" from Pontedeume who finds the solution by sprinkling salt at the entrance of the child's room.

In 2018, Jacobo Paz's "O gatipedro" tale was published by Baía Edicións, with pictures by Xosé Tomás.
