= Xaquín Lorenzo Fernández =

Spanish educator

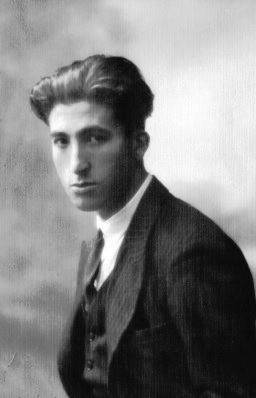
Xaquín Lorenzo Fernández

Xaquín Lorenzo Fernández, Xocas (June 23, 1907 – July 19, 1989), was a Spanish educator. He was born and died in Ourense, where he also studied. His teacher was Ramón Otero Pedrayo. He studied philosophy and letters in Santiago de Compostela and Zaragoza.

Xocas, when he was teacher in Ourense, entered in the Xeración Nós with Vicente Risco, Florentino López Cuevillas and Otero Pedrayo. He was member of the Seminario de Estudos Galegos, the Galician Royal Academy and president of the Museo do Pobo Galego.

He is the son of the writer Xosé Lorenzo Álvarez.

== Books ==
- Etnografía. Cultura material (volume 11 da Historia de Galicia, dirixida por Otero Pedrayo*.
- Vila de Calvos de Randín (1930, xunto con Florentino Cuevillas).
- Lápidas sepulcrales gallegas de arte popular.
- La Capilla y el Santuario del Santísimo Cristo de la Catedral de Ourense.
- Nosa Señora do Viso.
- La casa gallega.
- Cerámicas castrexas pintadas.
- Las habitaciones de los castros.
- O pastoreo na serra de Leboeiro.
- La capilla visigótica de Amiadoso.
- Deidades marianas en el Ourense romano.
- A casa.
- Vellas artes de pesca no río Miño.
- Distribucións dos xugos na Galiza.
- Metamorfose dunha casa castrexa.
- La iglesia prerrománica de Santa María de Mixós.
- Cantigueiro popular da Limia Baixa.
- Sobre algunos saludos en gallego.
