= Republican Nationalist Party of Ourense =

Republican Nationalist Party of Ourense Partido Nazonalista Repubricán de Ourense
- Leader: Ramón Otero Pedrayo
- Founded: 1930
- Dissolved: December 1, 1931
- Ideology: Galician nationalism Republicanism; Galicianism
- Colors
- Congreso de los Diputados (1931-1933): 1 / 470

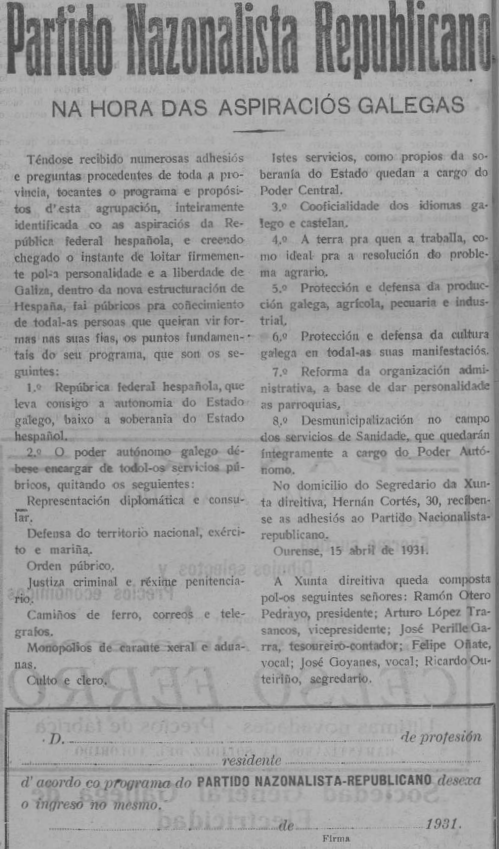

The Republican Nationalist Party of Ourense (Partido Nazonalista Repubricán de Ourense, PNRO) was a Galician nationalist party founded in late 1930 based in the province of Ourense. The main leaders of the party were Ramón Otero Pedrayo, Xaquín Lorenzo Fernández, Florentino López Cuevillas and Vicente Risco.

== History ==
The PNRO had 24 local branches (the largest was the city of Ourense, with 70 members). The main goal of the party was participating in the elections to the Constituent Cortes of 1931, in coalition with the Galician Republican Federation and the Radical Socialist Republican Party. Ramón Otero Pedrayo was elected MP with 35,443 votes, but Vicente Risco, with 19,615 votes, failed. The PNRO was one of the parties that participated in the creation of Partido Galeguista in December 1931.

== See also ==
- Vicente Risco
- Partido Galeguista
- Galicianism
- Galician nationalism
- History of Galicia
