= Dereita Galeguista =

- Leader: Vicente Risco, Xosé Filgueira Valverde
- Founded: 1935
- Dissolved: 1936
- Split from: Partido Galeguista
- Ideology: Galician nationalism Conservatism; Political Catholicism; Völkisch nationalism

Dereita Galeguista (Galicianist/Galician Nationalist Right, in English language) was a right-wing Galician nationalist party active in the final months of the Second Spanish Republic.

The origin of this short-lived party was the opposition of the Catholic and conservative sectors of the Partido Galeguista to potential agreements with left parties to enter the left-wing Popular Front. In May 1935, a group of militants Partido Galeguista in Pontevedra, headed by Xosé Filgueira Valverde left the party in protest against the policy of pacts with the left, and created a new organization known as Dereita Galeguista. In February 1936, and due to the formal incorporation of the Partido Galeguista to the Popular Front, Vicente Risco and other seven relevant Ourense members of the party left the PG. In Santiago de Compostela Mosquera Pérez and Manuel Beiras García also joined Dereita Galeguista. In its founding manifesto the organization declared itself as progressive, democratic, republican, cooperative and social-Christian.

After the start of the Spanish Civil War, Vicente Risco and some other militants joined the Nationalists, due to their Catholic ideology. Other militants opposed the Nationalists, like Otero Pedrayo or Manuel Beiras García.
