= A Nosa Terra =

- Front page of A Nosa Terra from 15 to December 21, 2005.
- Type: Weekly newspaper
- Format: Broadsheet
- Owner: Promocións Culturais Galegas
- Publisher: Promocións Culturais Galegas
- Founded: 1907
- Ceased publication: 2011
- Headquarters: Vigo, Galicia
- Website: www.anosaterra.com

A Nosa Terra (in English: Our Land) was a Galician newspaper in Galician language, first founded in 1907 in A Coruña, Spain. It has been published in different periods.

== Periods ==
=== 1907 - 1908 ===
A Nosa Terra, was a bilingual Spanish and Galician publication founded in 1907 in A Coruña by the regionalist organization Solidaridad Gallega. It was created under the initiative of Rodrigo Sanz, Manuel Murguía, Manuel Lugrís Freire and Florencio Vaamonde. Its first number appeared on 4 August 1907 and there were sixty issues published during the first run.

=== 1916 - 1936 ===
On December 14, 1916, A Nosa Terra was refunded and published by the Irmandades da Fala until 1932 and by Galeguist Party until 1936. During this period, A Nosa Terra was written only in Galician and used as a way to promote galeguism and getting closer to other nations.

==== History ====
The first issue appeared in 1916 in A Coruña and had eight pages. During its time in A Coruña, the headquarters were located in Xosé Iglesias Roura's office, who was its first director. Antón Villar Ponte was his successor until the Fourth Irmandades da Fala Assembly in 1922. In 1932, after the creation of Galeguist Party, A Nosa Terra became its official paper and the headquarters were translated to Pontevedra. In June 1933, A Nosa Terra was suspended due to financial reasons, but later was published again. In 1936 A Nosa Terra published its last issue in this period.

=== 1942 - 1972 ===
After the Spanish Civil War ended in 1939, many supporters of the galeguist movement had to leave Spain because of their ideology and settled in South America. On June 28, 1941, Irmandade Galega was founded in Buenos Aires and started to produce A Nosa Terra in that city as a successor of the previous period. Produced irregularly, A Nosa Terra contained information about the activities promoted by the nationalist groups in Buenos Aires and the rest of America. Castelao was named its director until his death in 1950. The final issue appeared in December 1972.

=== 1977 - 2011 ===
Spanish caudillo Francisco Franco's death in 1975 favoured the return of many exiled after the civil war. In 1977, a new newspaper named A Nosa Terra started being published weekly in Santiago de Compostela. Like the previous incarnations, it was nationalist and written in Galician only. A Nosa Terra was surrounded by controversy in 1981, when it was cancelled for three months because of its opposition to the Spanish Constitution of 1978. At this time, the headquarters were moved to Vigo.

In December 2007, A Nosa Terra redesigned its contents and external view, and they also created an online version. Financial problems always affected the newspaper, and it became unsustainable, until in August 2010 its publisher Promocións Culturais Galegas S.A. suspended payments and ended the printed edition. A Nosa Terra continued as an online newspaper, but was finally shut down in 2011.

== See also ==
- Irmandades da Fala
- Galeguist Party
- Castelao

== Bibliography ==
- Vicente Peña Saavedra (1998). Repertorio da prensa galega da emigración. Santiago de Compostela: Consello da Cultura Galega. pp. 163–164. ISBN 84-87172-30-X.
