= Partido Galeguista (1931) =

- Leader: Alfonso Daniel Rodríguez Castelao
- Founded: 1931
- Dissolved: 1950
- Merger of: Republican Nationalist Party of Ourense; Irmandades da Fala; Galician Autonomist Group; Labor Galeguista
- Newspaper: A Nosa Terra
- Youth wing: Federación de Mocedades Galeguistas
- Membership: 5,000 (1935)
- Ideology: Galician nationalism Republicanism; Antifascism; Pacifism; Internationalism; Factions: Social liberalism Socialism; Agrarian socialism Conservatism (Note: Until january 1936, when the conservative wing of the party formed Dereita Galeguista.); Galician independence
- Political position: Big tent (1931–1935); Left-wing to centre (1935–1950)
- Colors: Blue and white.
- Congreso de los Diputados (1936): 4 / 470

The Partido Galeguista (Galicianist Party) was a Galician nationalist party founded in December 1931. It achieved notoriety during the time of the Spanish Second Republic. The PG grouped a number of historical Galician intellectuals, and was fundamental in the elaboration of the Galician Statute of Autonomy.

== Origins ==
In December 1931 the Partido Galeguista de Pontevedra (Galicianist Party of Pontevedra), directed by Castelao and Alexandre Bóveda, called for a General Nationalist Assembly in order to create an all-Galician nationalist party. A total of 32 Galicianist organizations attended, including the Irmandades da Fala (Brotherhoods of the Language) and the Partido Nazonalista Republicán de Ourense (Republican Nationalist Party of Ourense), among others.

The PG was a plural party hosting different political tendencies, and where internal tensions were not uncommon. The PG initially embraced:

- Right-wing conservatives, who rejected the idea of forming alliances with left-wing parties. These were individuals such as Vicente Risco, Vilar Ponte, Filgueira Valverde
- Liberals, such as Otero Pedrayo, Plácido Castro
- Left-wing sympathizers, such as Alexandre Bóveda, Castelao, Carvalho Calero, Suárez Picallo, Johán Vicente Viqueira, Álvaro das Casas, Ramón Vilar Ponte,
- Supporters of the Galician secession, such as Fuco Gómez or the Buenos Aires organization Sociedade Nazionalista Gallega Pondal
- Non-aligned: Álvaro Cunqueiro, López Cuevillas

== Political ideas ==
The political programme of the PG revolved around the ideals established by the Irmandades da Fala, that is, considering Galicia as a cultural unit entitled to political self-determination. In order to achieve this the minimum required was forming a Galician Parliament and a Galician Government. It also aimed at eliminating clientelism, supporting anti-imperialism and equal rights for the women. Furthermore, the PG claimed for the suppression of the provincial governments (perceived as a redundant administrative structure) and the establishment of the parish as an official territorial tier. Official status for the Galician language and agrarian reform were also in the agenda.

Independence was never a priority for the PG, as independentists were a minority within the party. It was thought that Galicia could operate within the framework of a Spanish federal republic. Yet, War and the impossibility to establish such a federal republic led to disappointment. In a later stage, around 1944, PG's president and intellectual leader, Castelao, began to consider the option of full independence.

Members of the PG expressed a strong pro-Europeanism, situating the party ahead of its time on this issue. They also supported the strengthening of the League of Nations (predecessor of the UN) as a tool to solve international conflicts. In 1933, the PG successfully requested the admission of Galicia into the League as a stateless nation. Those negotiations were conducted by Plácido Castro.

== Consolidation ==
In 1932 the PG works alongside the Partido Republicano Gallego (Galician Republican Party) and Acción Republicana (Republican Action) in the drafting and promotion of the Statute of Autonomy. The PG negotiates a number of pacts with local parties and in 1933 it takes part in the local elections, obtaining a single local deputy for Ourense. This issue opens the debate in the PG, as some wanted to seek alliances with republican parties (left-wing), something which was frontally rejected by the conservatives.

The conservative pressure within the party forces PG to take part at the 1933 general Spanish elections on its own. The 106,000 votes obtained are not enough to grant a seat at the Spanish Parliament. Furthermore, the new conservative Spanish government halts the development of the Statute of Autonomy, bans PG's newspaper A Nosa Terra, and relocates Castelao and Bóveda far from Galicia (they were civil servants).

In its Third Assembly, January 1934, the PG eventually decides to ally with left-wing republican parties, with the opposition of Vicente Risco. This decision is ratified in the Fourth Assembly, April 1935, this time with the opposition of Otero Pedrayo. Thus, the conservative sector leaves the PG to found Dereita Galeguista (Galicianist Right-Wing). The PG then openly becomes a left-wing party.

== Frente Popular ==
In June 1935 the PG initiates negotiations with Izquierda Republicana (Republican Left), and in January 1936 the PG decides to integrate itself in the Frente Popular (Popular Front). Hence, the PG presented five Galicianist candidates to the Spanish general election of 1936, namely: Castelao, Bóveda, Xerardo Álvarez Gallego, Ramón Suárez Picallo and Antón Villar Ponte.

In the province of Lugo the PG ran on its own, since specific pacts for that province could not be formalized, thus obtaining no representatives. However, out of the five candidates the PG obtains three seats in the Spanish Parliament. These are Castelao, Súarez Picallo and Vilar Ponte, with a combined total of some 287,000 votes. As a consequence, in June 1936 the Statute of Autonomy is put to the vote with the help of the Frente Popular, and the "yes" wins with an overwhelming majority.

== Civil War ==
Following the revolt of general Francisco Franco in July 1936, and the start of the Spanish Civil War, normal political life comes to an end. Galicia soon falls under the control of Franco's Nationalist troops and PG members are prosecuted. Some of them are captured and executed, such as Johán Carballeira, Ánxel Casal, Manuel Lustres Rivas, Camilo Díaz Baliño, Víctor Casas or one of the main leaders of the party, Alexandre Bóveda. Others are forced into exile, like the president of the party, Castelao, who was in Madrid when the war started and managed to flee.

In 1937 the PG establishes a delegation in Barcelona, still a republican area, and publishes the magazine Nova Galicia between April 1937 and July 1938. Castelao and Suárez Picallo call for the unity of all democratic forces in Spain to preserve the Republic, while maintaining the Galicianist ideals. In 1938, after the fall of Barcelona, the Galicianists in the area move to France and from there to South America.

== The underground ==
As soon as the Civil War ended in 1939, Galicianists tried to get in touch again in order to rebuild the party in Galicia. The PG appeared in the underground in July 1943, when 19 members meet in Coruxo and decide to form a temporary executive committee, including Manuel Gómez Román, Otero Pedrayo and Plácido Castro. Yet, in this new period, Francisco Fernández del Riego and Ramón Piñeiro had the most active role.

One of the priorities was to establish contacts with the rest of the Galician opposition to the Francoist regime, and also with Basque and Catalan nationalists. In 1944 the PG forms together with the Spanish Socialist Party, CNT, UGT, and other trade unions, the Junta Gallega de Alianza Democrática (Galician Union for the Democratic Alliance).

Ramón Piñeiro was detained in 1946. Fermín Penzol took responsibility for keeping contact with the other organizations. With the release of Piñeiro in 1949, and in the light that the underground activity did not produce any palpable results, the PG led by Piñeiro decides to prioritise the defence of Galician culture, gradually abandoning the political activity. This was severely criticised by the Galicianists in exile. Hence, the foundation of the Galaxia publishing house, in 1950 marks the self-dissolution of the PG in Galicia. From that date militants in Galicia take part in the new cultural strategy, which revolved around Galaxia.

== The PG in the Americas ==
In 1932 a branch of the PG was created in Buenos Aires, Argentina. This was the Organizacion Nazionalista Repubricana Galega (Galician Republican Nationalist Organization). It had 150 members and was led by Rodolfo Prada. At the time of the Civil War it changes its name to Grupo Galeguista de Bos Aires (Galicianist Group of Buenos Aires). In 1941 it takes the name of Irmandade Galega (Galician Brotherhood). In 1942, with the massive arrival or Galician expatriates to Buenos Aires (including Castelao), this same group relaunches the PG newspaper A Nosa Terra. In 1944, Irmandade Galega, with the support of Castelao, establish the Consello de Galiza, a sort of Galician government in exile.

There was also a branch of the PG in Uruguay, named Irmandade Galeguista do Uruguai, led my Manuel Meilán. In 1949 the PG only had a total of some 200 active militants scattered around Buenos Aires and other Argentinian cities, Montevideo (Uruguay), Mexico and Havana (Cuba). With the cessation of the political activities of the PG in Galicia, the PG abroad quickly faded out, especially after the death of Castelao, the historical leader of the party, in 1950.

== See also ==
- Galician Statute of Autonomy of 1981
- Castelao
- Alexandre Bóveda
- Galicia
- Galician nationalism
- History of Galicia
