= Ramón Piñeiro López =

Spanish writer and politician

Ramón Piñeiro López (Láncara, 31 May 1915 – Santiago de Compostela, 27 August 1990) was a Spanish writer and politician who was active in Galicia. He was honored at the 2009 Galician Literature Day.

Piñeiro studied literature and philosophy at the Universities of Santiago de Compostela and Madrid, but he never completed his studies. He was active in the underground independent movement of Galicia. In 1946, he traveled to Paris to meet the republican government that was in exile. He was arrested, and spent the next three years in prison.

López was one of Galicia's historical figures in the 20th century, with a key role in continuing the Galicianism movement throughout the Spanish Civil War (for which reason he was imprisoned between 1946 and 1949).

As an intellectual, he was one of the founders and first directors of the Galaxia publishing house and the Grial magazine.

In politics, besides helping to form the Mocidades Galeguistas (Galicianist Youths), he was a member of the Galicianist Party. During Spain's democracy, he was also an independent deputy of the Parliament of Galicia, being listed with the Socialist Party (PSdeG-PSOE).

His main goal was to try to strip Galicianism of its political component, and to center it on its cultural component (a trend which would be labeled piñeirismo, named after him). In this regard, he appealed to the concept of saudade, (a concept to which he devoted several studies throughout his life), and the landscape and mood as the foundation of Galician identity and Galician's cultural essence.

Piñeiro conceived saudade as a feeling not aimed at anything specific, and unrelated to thought or will, which had been characterized as such by various Galician writers in the form of life or death instinct, as a feeling to overcome, etc. In his conception, contextualized by philosophical existentialism, saudade is a feeling of ontological loneliness, that is, a feeling derived from the singling out of the being.

His written work is divided between work of a philosophical nature (with particular attention to the issue of saudade, that he deals with from a Heideggerian existentialist perspective) and work with a linguistic and literary orientation (focusing on the problems of the Galician language's standardization process). He was also a pioneer in the translating works from other languages into Galician, among which was Heidegger's "On the Essence of Truth" (1956).

== Biography ==
He studied at the top high school in Lugo, where he joined the youth of the Galicianist Party, through which he participated in the provincial committee that worked on the referendum that decided the Galician Statute of Autonomy of 1936.

After the Spanish Civil War (in which he had to join the rebellious side to avoid reprisals), he studied Philosophy and Letters in Santiago de Compostela.
