= Uníos =

Uníos ('Unite') was a weekly newspaper published from Jaén, being the provincial organ of the Communist Party of Spain. Uníos was one of a number of Andalusian provincial communist newspapers founded after the Popular Front victory in the 1936 elections. Uníos was substituted by the publications Venceremos ('We shall win') and later Frente Sur ('Southern Front') during the Spanish Civil War.
