= Alexandre Bóveda =

Spanish politician and financial officer

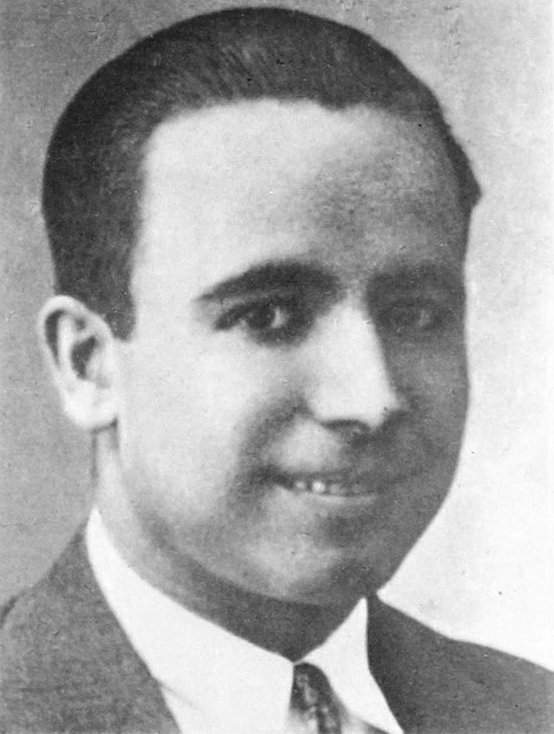
- Born: Alexandre Bóveda Iglesias; 7 June 1903; Ourense, Spain
- Died: 17 August 1937 (aged 34); A Caeira, Poio, Spain
- Cause of death: Execution by firing squad
- Occupations: Politician, financial officer
- Spouse: Amalia Álvarez Gallego

Alexandre Bóveda Iglesias (Ourense, 7 June 1903 - executed in A Caeira, Poio, 17 August 1936), commonly known as Alexandre Bóveda, was a Spanish politician and financial officer from Galicia. He is considered one of the most important Galicianist intellectuals during the Spanish Second Republic. He was one of the founders and key member of the Partido Galeguista (Galicianist Party), origin of contemporary Galician nationalism.

== Biography ==
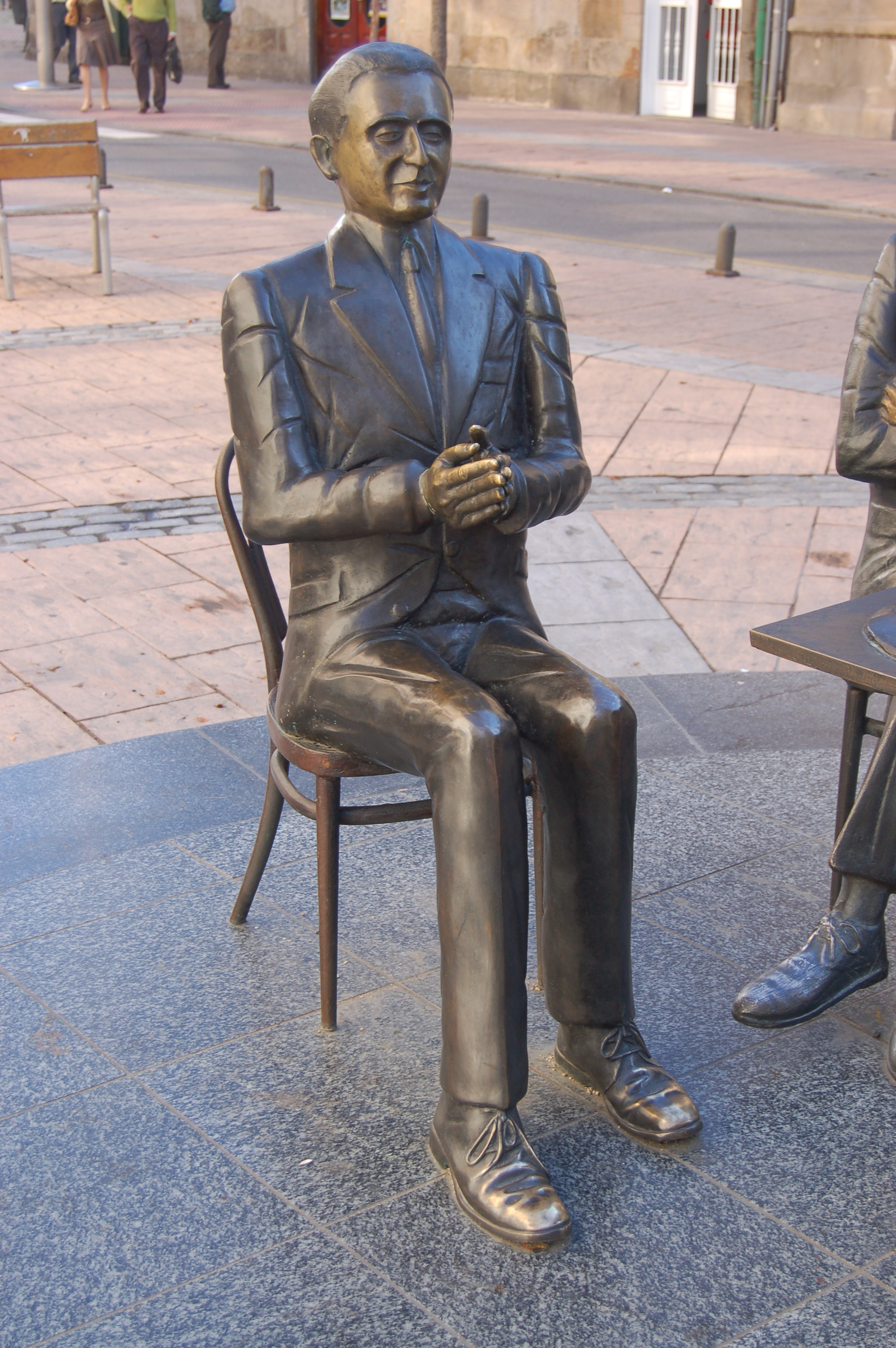
Statue of Alexandre Bóveda at San Xosé square, Pontevedra.

Bóveda studied French and commerce in the city of A Coruña. He also worked as a school teacher in his natal city of Ourense. He was a regular reader of the Galicianist journal Nós, and he soon felt the need to express his own ideas. He started publishing in the magazine La Zarpa, where he stood out as a great communicator. He also published in the Galicianist newspaper A Nosa Terra.

In 1924 he passed examinations in Madrid for a managerial position at the Spanish Ministry of Economy and Finance. He was offered a post in the Spanish capital by José Calvo Sotelo, but Bóveda opted for moving back to Galicia, where he worked at the delegation of the ministry in Ourense. After passing further examinations for a more senior position in accountancy, Bóveda eventually moved to Pontevedra in 1926. Pontevedra was at that time the central point of all Galicianist activity and cultural life in the country. Soon, Bóveda got acquainted with intellectuals such as Castelao and Losada Diéguez, deepening in his Galicianist political convictions.

In 1930 Boveda becomes the first director of the Caixa de Aforros Provincial de Pontevedra (Credit Union of Pontevedra). In 1928 and 1929 he is awarded with two professional grants from the provincial government to travel to Barcelona and the Basque Country in order to further study the functioning of credit unions.

In 1931 he is one of the founding members of the Partido Galeguista (Galicianist Party), a party with clear nationalist ideals. In 1932 he participated in the first meeting for the drafting of the Galician Statute of Autonomy, held in Santiago de Compostela. Bóveda was greatly involved in this project, to the point that Castelao considered him the person "without whom there would have not been a Statute". In 1933 he was designated as "core member" by the Comité de Autonomía (Committee for Autonomy). In fact, Castelao and other members of the Partido Galeguista (Galicianist Party) stated that Bóveda was the "motor" behind the whole process. Castelao and Bóveda were close personal friends. Castelao often labelled Bóveda as a "man of action", and unquestionably his "right-hand man" in setting up the Galicianist Party and moving the Statute of Autonomy forward.

In 1934, and probably linked to his political activities, he was transferred to the tax office of the southern Spanish city of Cádiz. Yet, he managed to return to Galicia in 1935, where he worked at the tax office in Vigo.

In 1936 he actively participated in the elections. He was a candidate for the Frente Popular alliance (Popular Front, which included the Galicianist Party), representing the province of Ourense. That same year he moved back to work at the tax office of Pontevedra.

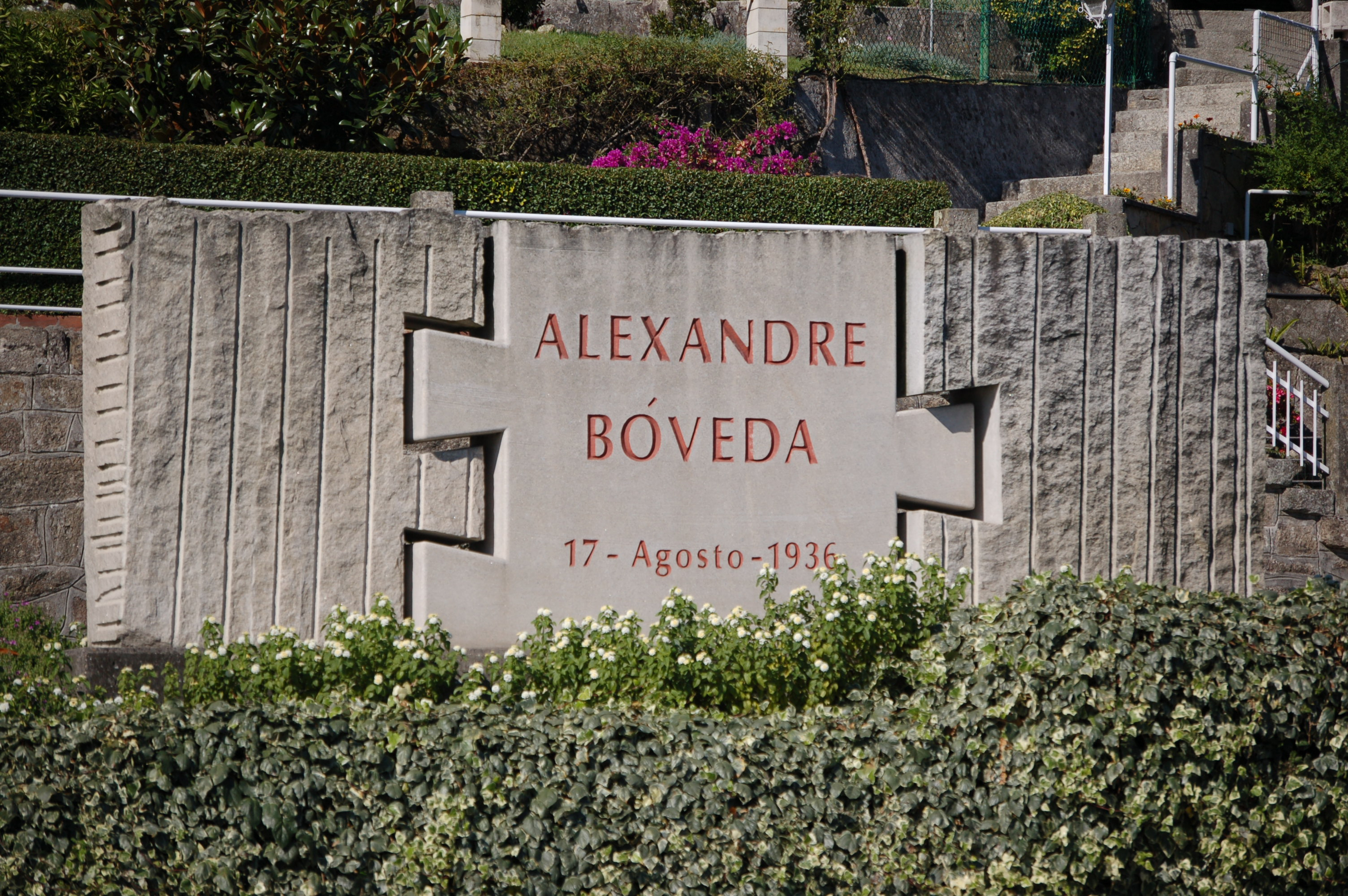
Monument to Bóveda in the spot where he was executed

However, 1936 was also the year of the July coup and the consequent start of the Spanish Civil War, eventually won by the Nationalist faction. Alexandre Bóveda was captured on July 20, accused of treason to Spain because of his Galician nationalist ideals, and sentenced to death. He was executed on 17 August 1936 in the place of A Caeira, Poio (near Pontevedra).

At present, the date is celebrated in Galicia with the name Día da Galiza mártir, where those who died for Galicia ("martyrs") are honoured. A monument was erected in the same spot where he was killed, that being the place where the official ceremony takes place every August 17, with local authorities and local representatives from the Galician government attending.

== See also ==
- Galician Statute of Autonomy (1936)
- Partido Galeguista (1931)
- Galician nationalism
