= Vicente Risco =

Galician intellectual

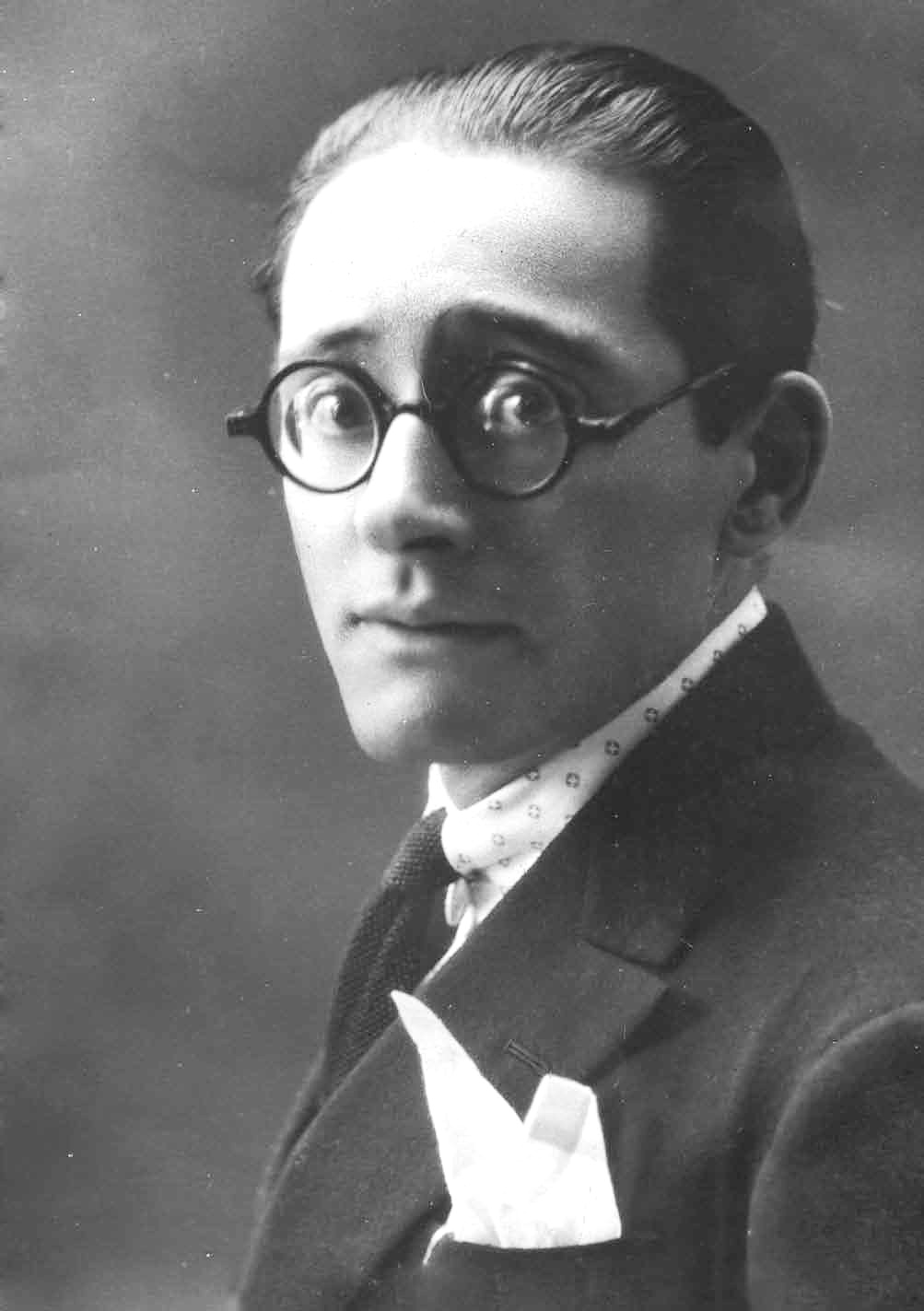
Vicente Risco.

Vicente Martínez Risco Agüero (October 1, 1884 – April 30, 1963) was a Galician intellectual of the 20th century. He was a founder member of Xeración Nós, and among the most important figures in the history of Galician literature. He is well regarded for his writings on Galician nationalism, as well as a contributor to the Galician New Narrative. He is also the father of Spanish novelist and critic Antonio Risco.

== Early years ==
The son of a public official and born in Ourense, Vicente Risco was born into a well-to-do and highly cultured family. He suffered from bad health as a child. He was a good friend of Ramón Otero Pedrayo. In 1899 he obtained his high school certificate. He studied law in the University of Santiago, and in 1906 became a public official as his father was.

In these years he participated in social gatherings directed by Marcelo Macías, with other intellectuals, such as Xulio Alonso Cuevillas or Arturo Vázquez Núñez, who would significantly influence Vicente Risco's literary career. He read decadent English and French authors, who exposed him to occultism and orientalism. He also studied Buddhism and became a Theosophist author.

In 1910 he began work for a local newspaper, El Miño, where he wrote philosophical articles under the pseudonyms Rujú Sahib and Polichinela. He became a follower of Rabindranath Tagore, announcing the fact in the intellectual social gatherings of Ourense.

In February 1912 Risco he met Castelao and praised one of his speeches in El Miño, but Risco was still far from the Galicianist movement.

In 1913 he went to Madrid to study Pedagogy. There he was a pupil of José Ortega y Gasset, spoke with Ramón Gómez de la Serna and Luis de Hoyos Sáinz and became attracted to Catholicism.

In 1916 he finished his studies and he returned to Ourense as a professor of history. In 1917 he founded, along with Arturo Noguerol Román, the literary magazine La Centuria, an antecedent of the future nationalist magazine Nós.

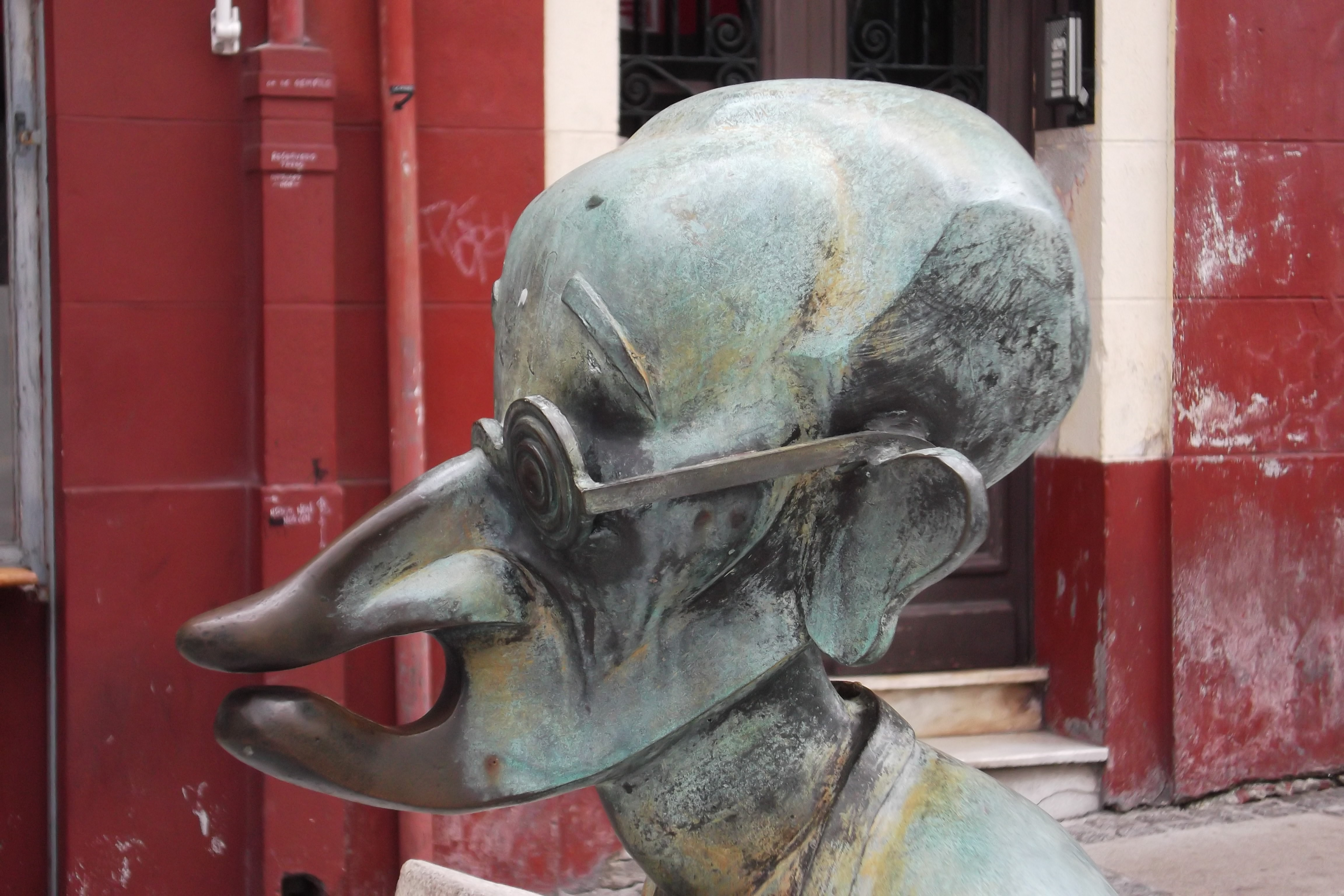
Risco at "Praza do Humor", A Coruña.

== Encountering Galicianism ==
Beginning in 1917, Vicente Risco entered the Irmandades da Fala under the influence of Antón Losada Diéguez, and on December 18, 1917, he gave his first speech in the Galician language, an act of support for Francesc Cambó. In the 1918 campaign for Parliamentary Elections, he made many speeches in the district of Celanova, to no acclaim. In July 1918, Risco began writing articles for A Nosa Terra. He tried to improve the status of Galician literature, writing about Arthur Rimbaud, Paul Verlaine, Apollinaire and Omar Khayyam.

Soon Risco had become the main theoretician and leader of Galician nationalism, and in November 1918 he played an important role in the I Nationalist Assembly.

In 1920 he published the book Theory of Galician Nationalism, considered the foundational text of Galician nationalism. Risco took ideas from Murguía and combined them with philosophical irrationalism, geographic determinism, neotraditionalism and ethnography; he defined the nation as a natural entity based on land, race, language, social organization, and national sentiment. He valued Galicia's geographical and cultural connection to Celtic history and the Atlantic region, as opposed to Spain's Mediterranean heritage.

In 1920 he started the magazine Nós, where he wrote over 100 articles until its cancellation in July 1936. He also directed the ethnographic section of the Seminario de Estudos Galegos. In 1922 he married María Carme Fernández Gómez. In 1923 his first son, Antón Risco, was born.

Risco initially supported the dictatorship of Miguel Primo de Rivera, because he saw in it the opportunity to destroy the cacique system and accept the role of provincial deputy in Ourense thinking of the possibility of the establishment of a Commonwealth of Galicia, similar to the Commonwealth of Catalonia. After his rupture with the Irmandade da Fala da Coruña and A Nosa Terra he wrote for Rexurdimento, the newspaper of the Irmandade Nazonalista Galega (Galician Nationalist Brotherhood), although he returned to A Nosa Terra after a short time.

In April 1930 he travelled to Berlin, living there for four months and delivering a course in ethnography at the University of Berlin. After that he became more conservative and Catholic. He wrote a book, Mitteleuropa, in which he described his European trip.

== Second Republic ==
In the VI Nationalist Assembly Risco supported the idea of the transformation of the Irmandades da Fala into a political party. With Ramón Otero Pedraio he founded the Partido Nazonalista Republicán de Ourense to take part in the elections of 1931. After losing the election for the position of deputy, he began to lose influence in the Galicianist movement in favour of Otero Pedraio and Castelao.

On October 25, 1931, he led a group of Galicianists that published a Catholic manifest against what they considered the persecution of the Catholic Church by the Republican government.

In 1933 he published Nós, os inadaptados, in which he expounded his spiritual and cyclical conception of history.

In the Third Assembly of the PG (October 1935), he accepted temporary collaboration with the left-wing parties to avoid the dissolution of the PG. In January 1935 he published an article in the Heraldo de Galicia, where he called for the reconquest of Galicia by God. In confrontation with the leaders of his party he didn't attend the IV Assembly of the PG in Monforte de Lemos. It was during that assembly the accords with left-wing parties were ratified. In the extraordinary Assembly of Santiago in February 1936 the PG formed a coalition with the Popular Front. Risco united with the group of right-wing Galicianists, and he left the PG to direct Dereita Galeguista.

On June 13, 1936, when the campaign began to establish the Statute of Autonomy of Galicia, he supported the affirmative vote. When the Civil War began, he did nothing to help his Galicianist friends that were murdered or imprisoned. From 1937 he directed Misión, founded with Otero Pedraio. After 1938 he started to write articles for La Región where he supported Franco's band. As a result, old Galicianist friends regarded him as a traitor. This is symbolized in the phrase of Castelao in his book Sempre en Galiza: "...said Risco, when Risco was somebody".

== Francoist Spain ==
In 1940 he published the ethnographic work The end of the world in the Galician popular tradition and in 1944 published History of the Jews after the destruction of the Temple. He lived for a time in Pamplona and wrote articles for El Pueblo Navarro. In 1945 he lived in Madrid, where he wrote articles for El Español, Pueblo and La Estafeta Literaria, and he published in 1947 Satanás. Biografía del Diablo. He returned to Ourense in 1948.

With the help of Galicianist friends Otero Pedrayo and Francisco Fernández del Riego, he again started writing in Galician: in his ethnographic studio he wrote History of Galiza directed by Otero Pedrayo, and translated Camilo José Cela's book The family of Pascual Duarte, completed in 1951.

Nevertheless, Castilian would be the language employed in the rest of his literary production after the Civil War. The best book of this stage was La puerta de paja, runner-up to the prestigious Premio Nadal in 1953. He also wrote La tiara de Saitaphernes, Gamalandafa and La verídica historia del niño de dos cabezas de Promonta, which were not published during his lifetime.

He died on April 30, 1963, in Ourense, a few days after Franco's government gave him the Medal of Alfonso X.

== Ideology ==
The political ideology of Vicente Risco was based on a critique of the modern world, considered decadent. He exalted irrationalism, mysticism and popular religion, and rejected realist literature. He also despised Mediterranean civilization in favor of Celticism. Since his youth he espoused racist ideas, later defined as properly antisemitic. He praised Nazism as a "vital reaction of the German nation". A follower of the essentialism of Manuel Murguía vis-à-vis the concept in nation, he saw the Iberian Peninsula as divisible into two parts: north and south from the Duero River. The north would be aryan and superior, and the south semitic and inferior.

== Literature ==
- A trabe de ouro e a trabe de alquitrán
- O lobo da xente, 1925
- A coutada, 1926
- O Porco de Pé, 1928
- O bufón d'el rei, 1928
- Nós, os inadaptados, 1933
- La puerta de paja, 1953
