= High Court of Justice of Galicia =

- Tribunal Superior de Xustiza de Galicia
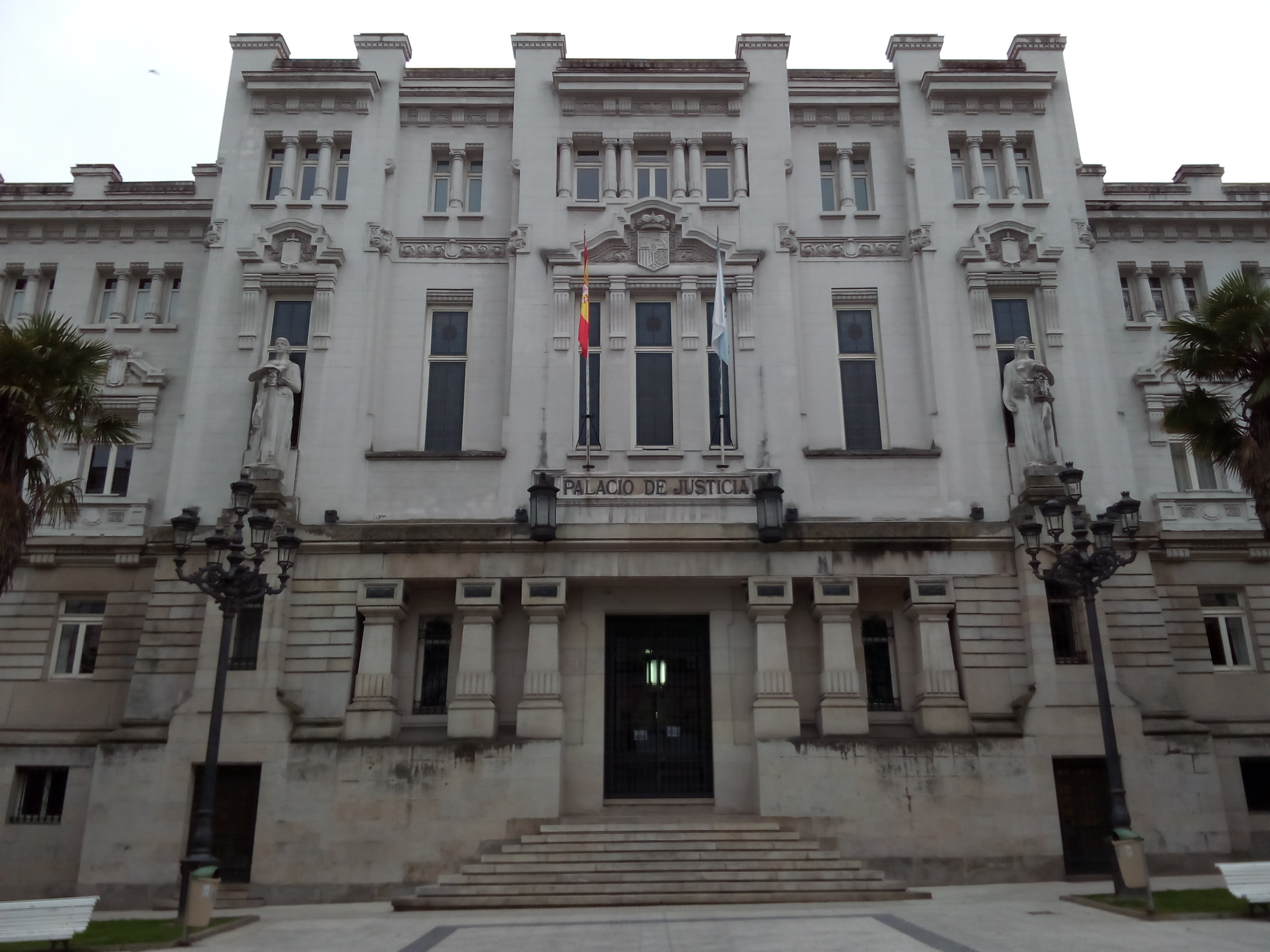
- Interactive map of High Court of Justice of Galicia
- 43.364630°N 8.407229°W
- Established: 1989
- Jurisdiction: Galicia
- Location: Pazo de Xustiza, A Coruña
- Coordinates: 43.364630°N 8.407229°W
- Composition method: Partisan election
- Authorised by: Lei Orgánica do Poder Xudicial, 1989
- Appeals to: Spanish Supreme Court
- Website: www.xunta.es

President of the High Court of Justice of Galicia
- Currently: Miguel Cadenas
- Since: 23 December 2008

The High Court of Justice of Galicia (Galician: Tribunal Superior de Xustiza de Galicia, TSXG) is the highest body and last judicial instance in the Galician jurisdiction, integrating the Spanish judiciary. Together with the Parliament of Galicia (legislative branch) and the Galician Government (executive branch), the TSXG is one of the three main institutions representing Galicia's self-government, as established and regulated by the Galician Statute of Autonomy of 1981.

The TSXG regulates the functions of the judges and looks over the different provincial courts. The TSXG is the final appellate court in Galician territory, notwithstanding the right of a citizen to appeal to the Spanish Supreme Court and/or the European Court of Justice.

The TSXG was created on 23 March 1989 with the Organic Law of Judicial Authority (Galician: Lei Orgánica do Poder Xudicial), as part of the process of devolution to Galicia from the Spanish government, started in 1979. Its headquarters are located at the Pazo do Xustiza, A Coruña.

== Composition ==
=== Organization ===
The High Court of Justice of consists of three courts, although a fourth, for Minors, has been proposed.

- Civil and Penal (Sala do Civil e Penal): Five magistrates, including the President of the Tribunal.
- Contentious-Administrative (Sala do Contencioso-Administrativo): Fourteen magistrates, distributed in four sections.
- Social (Sala do Social): Sixteen magistrates, distributed in four sections.

=== President ===
==== Appointment process ====
Candidates need to obtain a three fifths (13) supermajority of the 21 votes of the General Council of Judicial Authority (Spanish: Consejo General del Poder Judicial).

==== Current ====
The current president of the court is the progressive magistrate Miguel Ángel Cadenas Sobreira. He was elected to this post by his peers in a vote on the 23 December 2008 by 13 votes to 7, with one abstention.

==== Former presidents ====
- Xosé Cora (1989—1990)
- Xosé Ramón Vázquez Sandes (1990—1999)
- Xesús Souto Prieto (1999—2006)
- Antonio González Nieto (29 March 2006—February 2009) (interim)
- Miguel Ángel Cadenas Sobreira (2009—)

== See also ==
- Separation of Powers
- Galician Statute of Autonomy of 1981
- Galicia
