= Alfonso Daniel Rodríguez Castelao =

Galician politician, writer, painter, and doctor

Castelao
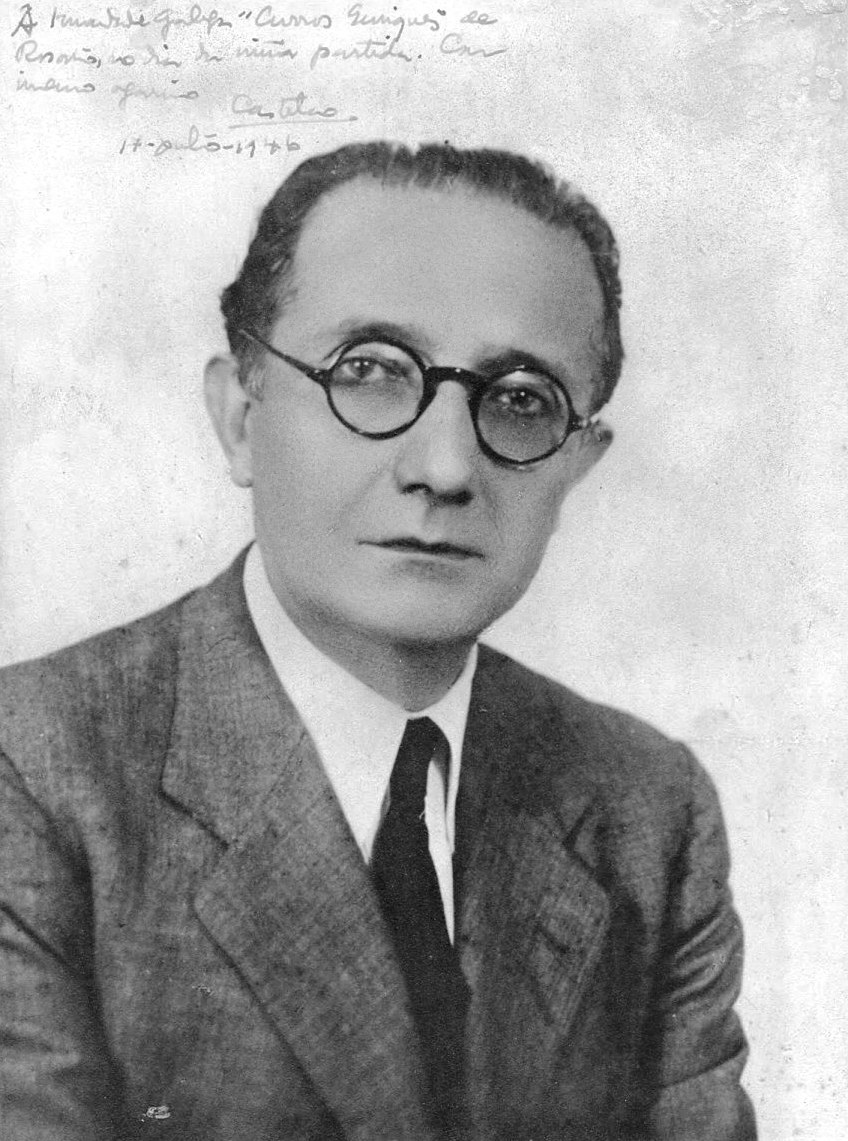
- Castelao in 1946.
- Born: Alfonso Daniel Rodríguez Castelao; 30 January 1886; Rianxo, Galicia, Spain
- Died: 7 January 1950 (aged 63); Buenos Aires, Argentina
- Citizenship: Spain
- Education: University of Santiago de Compostela
- Occupations: Politician; writer; painter; caricaturist; doctor
- Writing career
- Language: Galician
- Notable work: Sempre en Galiza
- Movement: Xeración Nós

Signature
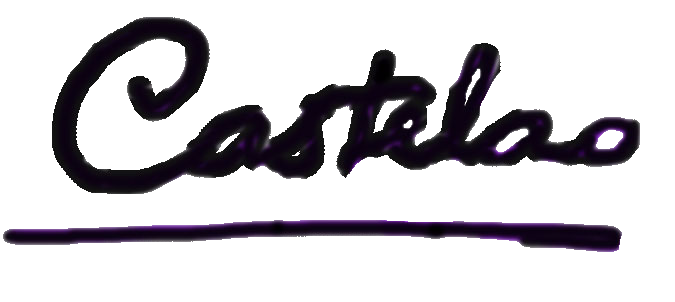

Alfonso Daniel Rodríguez Castelao (30 January 1886 – 7 January 1950), commonly known as Castelao, was a Galician politician, writer, painter and doctor. He is one of the fathers of Galician nationalism, promoting Galician identity and culture, and was one of the main names behind the cultural movement Xeración Nós. He was also one of the founders and president of the Galicianist Party and had a great influence on the renovating group of Galician art known as Os renovadores. Castelao is considered to be the most important figure in Galician culture of the 20th century.

== Early life and youth (1886–1929) ==
Alfonso Daniel Rodríguez Castelao was born on 30 January 1886 in the town of Rianxo, Galicia. He was the firstborn of Manuel Rodríguez Dios, a mariner who made sails for ships, and Joaquina Castelao Genme. On the day of his birth he was baptised at the parish church of Santa Comba with his maternal aunt and uncle, Pilara and Francisco Castelao, as godparents.

He spent his childhood and adolescence in Santa Rosa de Toay, Argentina. In 1900, the Rodríguez Castelao family returned to Rianxo.

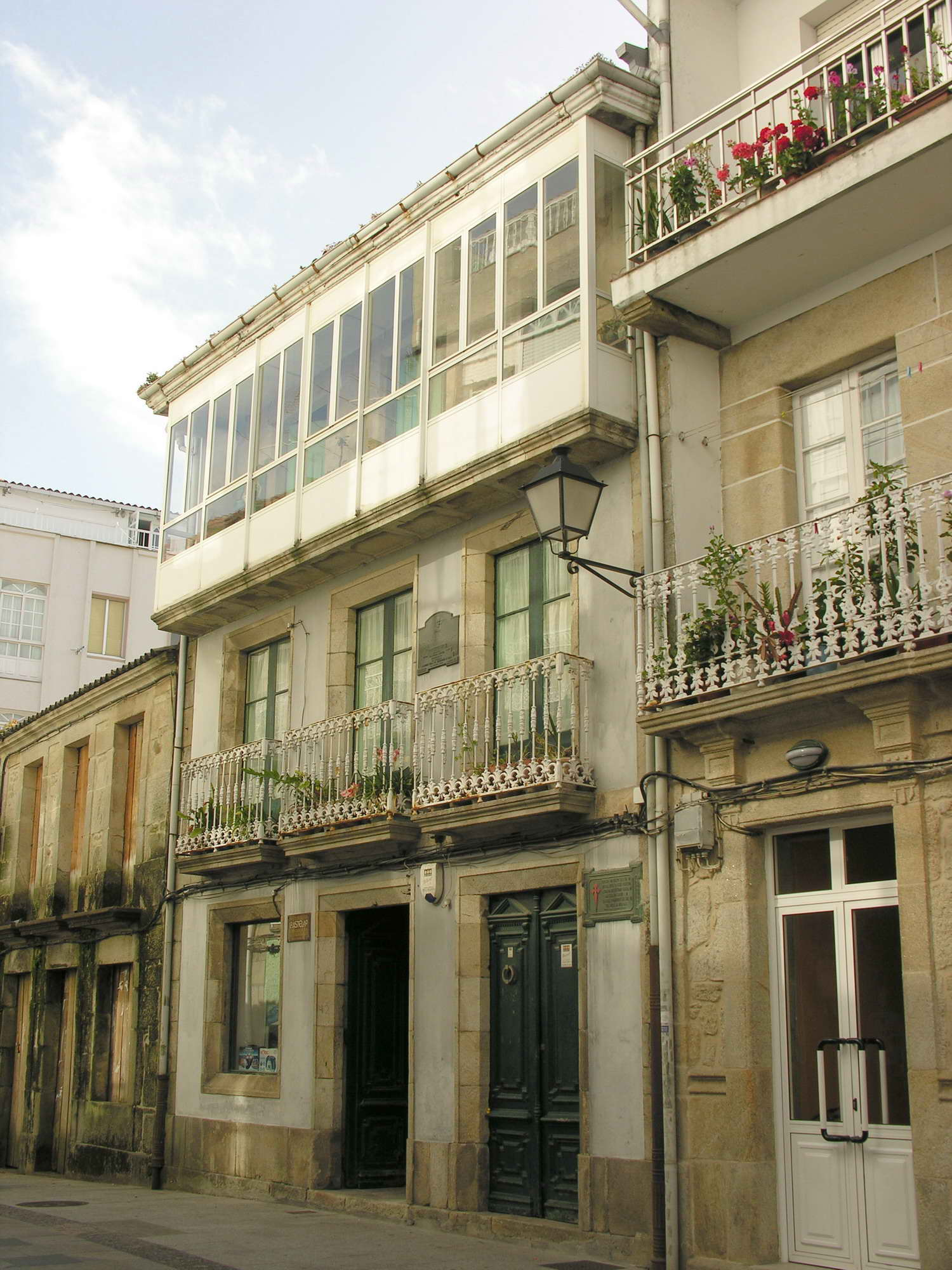
Rodríguez Castelao's family home in Rianxo

In 1908 he obtained his degree in medicine from the University of Santiago de Compostela. During his university years Rodríguez Castelao joined the tuna, with which he visited Portugal in a number of occasions. He passed his doctorate in Madrid in 1909, where he began to gain some popularity as a caricaturist and cartoon artist. In fact, Rodríguez Castelao often admitted he only studied medicine to please the wishes of his father. He rarely practiced medicine professionally despite having the credentials for it. He eventually settled down in Rianxo, where he joined the political movement Acción Gallega ("Galician Action"). As a caricaturist, Rodríguez Castelao focussed on the everyday in a humorous way, although after experiencing the Spanish Civil War, he turned to using his art to denounce the cruelties of Fascism in a collection of paintings. His paintings would also depict casual moments of Galician life and culture.

In 1916, he moved to Pontevedra, where he joined the Irmandades da Fala ("Brotherhoods of the Language"). Rodríguez Castelao developed an emotional attachment with Pontevedra and frequently claimed he wanted to be considered a native of that city; he even expressed a will to be buried there and not back in his original Rianxo or elsewhere. The city of Pontevedra was his last place of residence in Galicia. A plaque commemorates that he lived at number 1 Plaza de España in Pontevedra. Also in 1916, he participated in the Asembleia Nazonalista de Lugo ("Nationalist Assembly of Lugo"), signing a declaration for the history of Galician nationalism.

In exile, Castelao reminisced about his beloved Pontevedra as follows:

Para sentir o orgullo de ser fillo da terra máis fermosa do mundo, eu rubo ao pinal de Matalobos, que está enriba da eirexa de Salcedo. Séntome nas pedras do valado, e chanto os ollos na ría que durme antre veigas e florestas. Asisto á transformación dun día de sol en noite de luar. Alí sinto como en ningures a necesidade cósmica da patria e sei que son un anaquiño de eternidade galega. ¡Meu Pontevedra!

To feel the pride of being a child of the most beautiful land in the world, I climb up to the Matalobos pine forest, which is above the church of Salcedo. I sit on the stones of the fence and gaze at the Pontevedra Ria, which sleeps between meadows and forests. I witness the transformation from a sunny day to a moonlit night. There, like nowhere else, I feel the cosmic need for my homeland and know that I am a little piece of Galician eternity. My Pontevedra!

In 1920, he starts publishing the magazine Nós, together with Vicente Risco and Otero Pedrayo. That same year he travelled through France, the Netherlands and Germany. In 1922, he wrote the novel Un ollo de vidro and in 1924 he joined the Seminário de Estudos Galegos ("Seminar of Galician Studies") and founded the Pontevedra Polyphonic Choir; as he was an amateur musician). Two years, in 1926, he published Cousas. He travelled to Brittany in 1928 to study calvaries and publish As cruces de pedra na Bretaña. That is also the year when his only son dies at the age of 14.

== Political career (1930–1950) ==
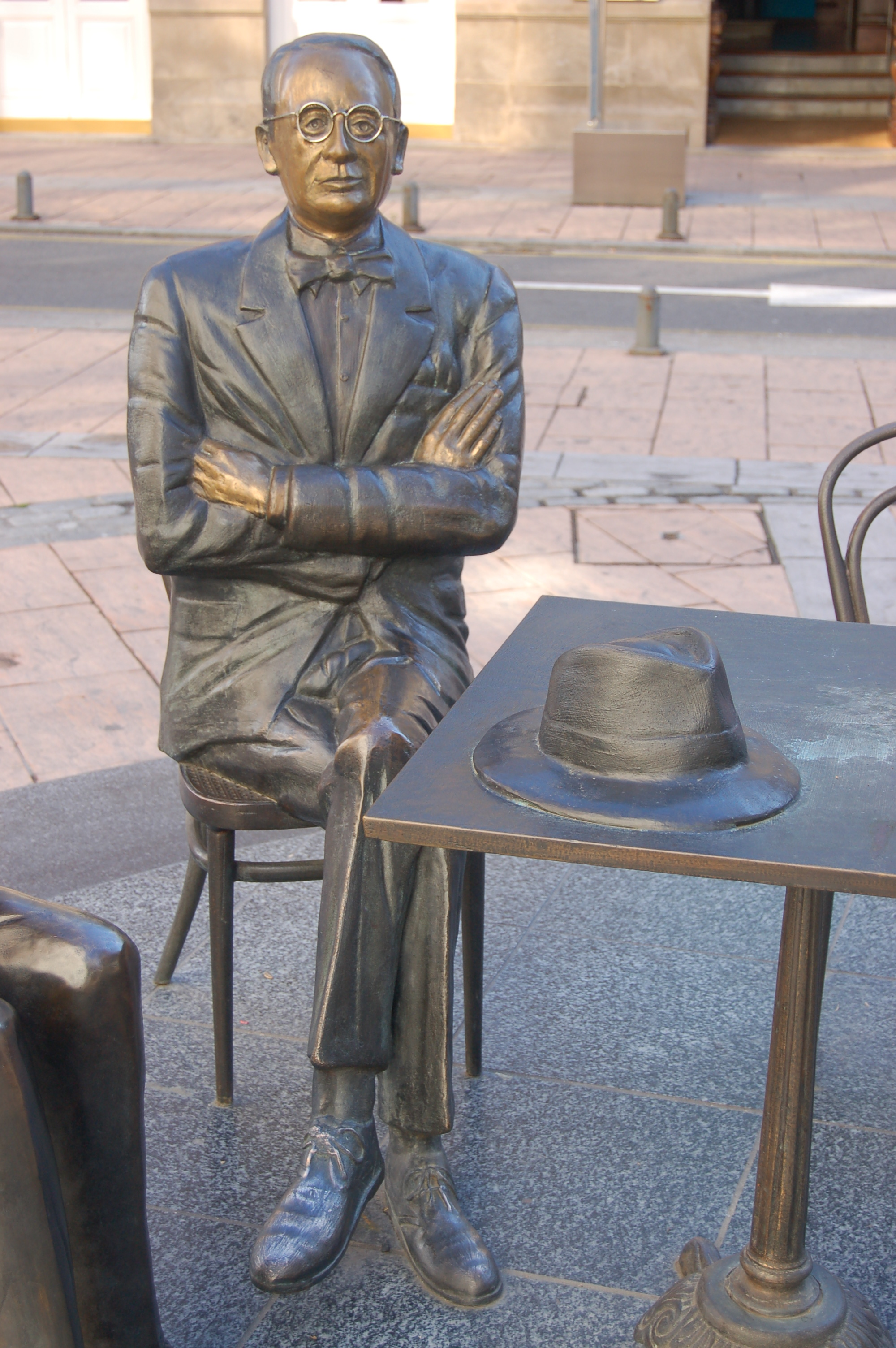
Statue of Rodríguez Castelao in the Tertulia Monument in his adoptive city of Pontevedra

From 1930 Rodríguez Castelao's political activism intensifies even further. His life and work always revolved around politics and his Galician nationalist ideas. In his book Sempre en Galiza he states that all his works, talent and efforts would always be used for the profit of the Galician cause.

In 1930, he founded the Galician Republican Federation at Lestrove Palace and participated in the meetings of the Galician Nationalist Republican Party and in the assembly for the Federal State of Galicia. The next year he published the book Nós and became the official representative of the Galicianist Party to the Cortes Generales. In 1934, he published Retrincos, Os dous de sempre and the a re-edition of Cousas.

He became a member of the Royal Galician Academy in 1933, and shortly after that, in 1935, he was forced into exile by the Spanish government to the Spanish city of Badajoz, in Extremadura, where he worked as a civil servant. It was then where he began to write what would become his key work, Sempre en Galiza. In 1936 he gained a seat at the Spanish parliament, this time representing the Popular Front coalition, which included the Galicianist Party.

The Spanish civil war began whilst Castelao was in Madrid presenting the results of the referendum for the Galician Statute of Autonomy, which had been approved by 98 per cent of voters, and in which Castelao had played a role, together with his personal friend Alexandre Bóveda. During the war he organised the Galician militias in collaboration with the Spanish Communist Party and declared his support to the government of the Spanish Republic. As the Nationalist troops advanced Castelao fled to Valencia – where he still had time to publish Galicia Martir and Atila en Galicia – and later moved to Barcelona.

In 1938, he was sent by the Spanish government to the Soviet Union, the United States and Cuba, in order to obtain support for the Republic. From New York City he cruised to Buenos Aires, where in 1941 he performed for the first time the play Os vellos non deben de namorarse, Castelao's contribution to Galician theatre.

In 1944, while in Buenos Aires, he finished and published a work of Galician political theory: Sempre en Galiza (lit. "Always in Galicia"), which was in fact a compilation of three books (three parts) and a number of other texts. Sempre en Galiza has been considered one of the most advanced political texts of its time. Also in that year he became the first president of the Consello de Galiza, the Government of Galicia in exile. In 1945, together with Catalan and Basque intellectuals in exile, he founded the magazine Galeuzca as an evocation of the political alliance of 1933 between Galicia, Catalonia and the Basque Country. In 1946 he was appointed as minister without portfolio in the Spanish Republican government in exile led by José Giral, while living in Paris. In 1947, back in Buenos Aires and after being diagnosed with lung cancer, he published As cruces de pedra na Galiza.

Castelao died on 7 January 1950 at the hospital of the Centro Gallego in Buenos Aires. The Argentine Senate and the City of Buenos Aires erected monuments to honour him. Since then, most of his work has been translated and published into other languages. In 1984, Castelao's remains were brought back to Galicia and he was buried at the Panteón de Galegos Ilustres ("Pantheon of Illustrious Galicians"), Bonaval, in the capital city of Santiago de Compostela.

== Political views ==
Castelao was a Galician nationalist (heir of the early Galicianism), federalist, pacifist, progressive, and internationalist. He accepted the autonomy granted to Galicia by the Second Spanish Republic as a tool to construct a possible Galician State, in federation with other Iberian nations. He was also a convinced pro-European. He wrote in Sempre en Galiza that one of his dreams was to "one day see the emergence of a 'United States of Europe' ".

At the end of his life, and as expressed in the final parts of Sempre en Galiza, Castelao became somewhat disappointed with the Spanish Republican politicians in exile, and began to discuss the advantages of a completely independent Galician State.

=== Idea of Spain ===
Castelao always used the term of Hespaña instead of España, taken directly from the old name Hispania. By using Hespaña he was in fact referring to the Iberian Peninsula as a whole, and not just to the country known as Spain. In fact, he would use the term España in a depreciative way, an example of the "past" and what "should be avoided". It was his ideal that a federation of "Iberian Nations" should emerge to create this new Hespaña. For Rodríguez Castelao these nations were: Castile, Catalonia, the Basque Country, Portugal and Galicia. He also implied that apart from creating the political conditions for it, cultural conditions (education) should also be provided.

(...) Hespaña, a name we had to sweeten by adding a letter in order to make it respectable to our eyes, since all we can say about its government is that it is hateful because it is even more hypocritical than simply tyrannical. If we remove of the word España all that it has of Castilian legacy (we just have to add a "h" to derive it from Hispania), we can embrace with it all the Peninsula, making it a synonymous of Iberia .

— Castelao, Sempre en Galiza, 1944

Castelao did not support the classical idea of Iberian Federalism, as this advocated for the union of the two Iberian States, Spain and Portugal as such, and not of what he considered to be the real five nations of Iberia. He pointed out that before these nations could federate the Spanish State should "break up" first, so all nations could pact entering the new federation on equal political terms, as free-states. He resented that Spain had a disproportionate influence from Castile, which was taking over the other nations and regions.

Then again, Castelao seemed to have gained a sympathy for the idea of full independence for Galicia in the last years of his life, as succinctly mentioned in Sempre in Galiza and in a number of late texts and letters.

We are "secessionist" when we defend the intrinsic values of our nation, and we are "unionist" when we consider that there is a need to co-ordinate our relative values with the relative values of the rest of Hespaña and the World.

— Castelao, op. cit.

The fundamental problem of Spain can only be resolved in two ways: federation or secession.

— personal letter to José Aguirre, 1943

From an ideological point of view I am willing to consider secession and all of its consequences, because I am a nationalist (...) (I would support an) open and frontal fight for our national independence, in case no other possibility of federation or confederation with Spain was possible

— personal letter to José Aguirre, June 1944

== Language ==
Although bilingual in Galician and Spanish, Castelao always wrote and published in Galician, with very rare exceptions. He was a keen defender of Galician culture and considered the language to be the key element of cohesion among the Galician people. In Sempre en Galiza he stated "If we are Galician still that is by deed and grace of speaking our own language". Castelao often criticised the imposition of Spanish language in Galicia, and demanded for Galician to become an official language and thus the preferred language in the administration and education.

Castelao could, in a way, be considered a pre-reintegrationist as he claimed that Galician and Portuguese had not just a common origin, but also a "common future". In his travels to Portugal, and sporadically to Brazil while residing in Argentina, Castelao was impressed with how easily he could use his native Galician in order to communicate freely with Portuguese speakers.

Galician is a widespread and useful language which – with small variations – is spoken in Brazil, Portugal and in the Portuguese colonies.

— Castelao, Sempre en Galiza, 1944

Nevertheless, Castelao never used Portuguese orthography in his writings, despite affirming that "I hope that one day Galician and Portuguese will, gradually and naturally, merge". Indeed, Castelao's political writings were addressed to a Galician audience mostly, hence he used a type of language and spelling that could be easily understood by all. He did make use of old Galician words, often common in Portuguese, as a way to progressively introduce them into colloquial speech; for example his preference for the term Galiza instead of Galicia for the name of the country.

== Works ==
- Cego da romería (1913)
- Diario (1921)
- Un ollo de vidro. Memorias d'un esquelete (1922)
- Cousas (1926, 1929)
- Cincoenta homes por dez reás (1930)
- As cruces de pedra na Bretaña (1930)
- Nós (1931)
- Os dous de sempre (1934)
- Retrincos (1934)
- Galicia Mártir (1937)
- Atila en Galicia (1937)
- Milicianos (1938)
- Sempre en Galiza (1944)
- Os vellos non-deben de namorarse (play represented in 1941, published posthumously in 1953)
- As cruces de pedra na Galiza (published posthumously in 1950)

== See also ==
- Partido Galeguista
- Galician nationalism
- Galician Statute of Autonomy
- Galicianism
