= Xohana Torres =

Spanish poet, writer and playwright (1929–2017)

- Born: November 22, 1929
- Died: September 12, 2017 (aged 87)
- Occupations: Writer; poet; playwright

Xohana Torres Fernández (22 November 1929 – 12 September 2017) was a Spanish writer, poet, playwright.

== Biography ==
Torres was born in Santiago de Compostela on 22 November 1931.

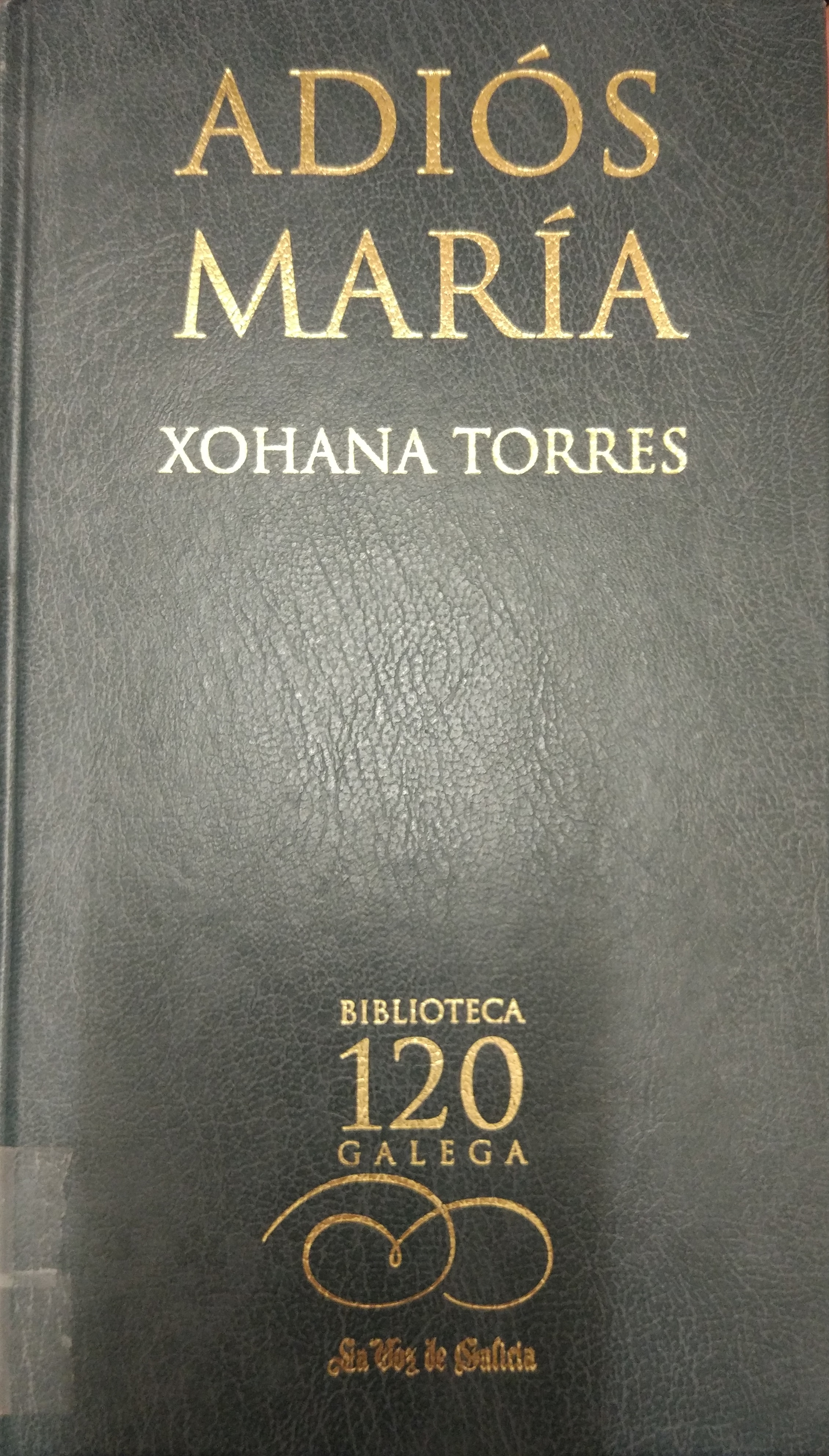
BAdiós, María

She was a member of the Royal Galician Academy. Her best known works included the novel, Adiós, María (1971), which won the Galician literary prize from the Galician Center of Buenos Aires, and Estación ao mar (1980). Torres was part of a generation of writers who championed Galician language and literature during the Francoist era at a time when regional languages were routinely suppressed.

Torres also directed Raíz e Tempo, the first cultural radio program broadcast exclusively in Galician. Examples of her works of children's literature include Polo mar van as sardiñas (1968) and Pericles e a balea (1984).

She died in Vigo, Galicia, Spain, on 12 September 2017, at the age of 85.
