= Bible translations into Galician =

The translation of the Bible into the modern Galician language was begun in 1968 by Editorial SEPT of Vigo, and published in 1989.

In the 19th Century a translation of the Gospel of Matthew was commissioned by Luís Luciano Bonaparte from the journalist Vicente Turnes (gl), but the result was considered too Castilian and a second version was commissioned from an otherwise unknown translator, probably a Galician residing in London, a certain José Sánchez de Santa María. This second commission was published in London in 1861 with the title Observaciones comparativas sobre la pronunciación gallega, asturiana, castellana y portuguesa.
