= Ramón Otero Pedrayo =

Galician geographer, writer and intellectual

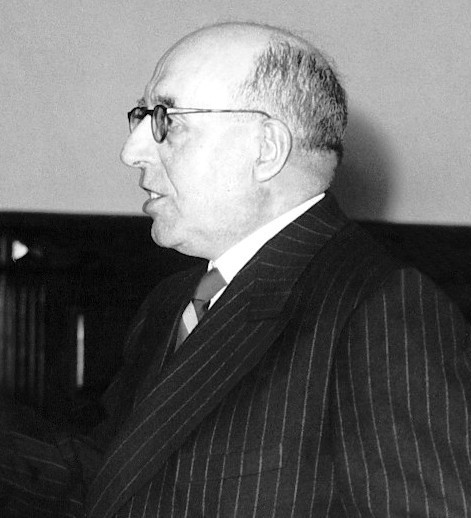
Ramón Otero Pedrayo.

Ramón Otero Pedrayo (alternative spelling Outeiro Pedraio) (Ourense, Galicia, 1888 – Ourense, 1976) was a Galician geographer, writer and intellectual. He was a key member of the Galician cultural and political movement Xeración Nós.

== Biography ==
Otero Pedrayo taught geography and history in Burgos and Santander (Spain), before he went back to his natal city of Ourense. In 1918 he becomes a member of the Galicianist organisation Irmandades da Fala. He was a member of the Spanish parliament during the time of the Spanish Second Republic representing the Republican Nationalist Party of Ourense and the Galicianist Party.

He was the first professor of geography at the University of Santiago de Compostela. Apart from being considered the person who first introduced modern geography to Galicia, he was also a prolific writer, as demonstrated by his numerous essays, novels, plays and poems. He was also renowned as a great orator with a charismatic voice . In 1933, he addressed a speech at a rally during the Basque Fatherland Day organized by the Basque Nationalist Party at San Sebastián, Gipuzkoa (picture above).

Some of his most famous novels were Os camiños da vida, O mesón dos Ermos and Arredor de si (often considered a veiled autobiography), where he provided a meticulous description of Galician rural life. His non-scientific works are often taken as historical sources, since they are quite accurate and rigorous in terms of localization, description and context.

Among his scientific works, the encyclopaedia Historia de Galiza (first published in 1962) stands out as a colossal project. In his many works he depicts with precision the history, geography, folklore and anthropology of Galicia. He was the first geographer to define Galicia as an Atlantic country, that is, of Atlantic and not Mediterranean culture. And together with archaeologist Florentino López Cuevillas, he was one of the first researchers embarking on a systematic scientific study of Galicia's Celtic past.

There is a foundation named after him, which preserves and promotes his works.

== Partial bibliography ==
=== (in Galician) ===
- Pantelas, home libre (short stories) (1925)
- O purgatorio de don Ramiro (short stories) (1926)
- Síntesis xeográfica de Galicia (geography) (1926)
- Escrito na néboa (short stories) (1927)
- Os camiños da vida (novel in three books) (1928)
- A lagarada (theatre play) (1928)
- Arredor de si (novel) (1930)
- Contos do camiño e da rúa (short stories) (1932)
- Fra Vernero (novel) (1934)
- Teatro de máscaras (theatre play) (1934)
- Devalar (novel) (1935)
- O mesón dos ermos (short stories) (1936)
- O desengano do prioiro (theatre play) (1952)
- Entre a vendima e a castiñeira (short stories) (1957)
- Bocarribeira. Poemas pra ler e queimar (poetry) (1958)
- Rosalía (theatre dialogues) (1959)
- O señorito da Reboraina (novel) (1960)
- Historia de Galiza (historical/geographical encyclopaedia, 1962)
- Síntesis histórica do século XVIII en Galicia (history) (1969)
- O fidalgo e a noite (theatre dialogues) (1970)
- Noite compostelá (theatre dialogues) (1973)
- O Maroutallo (short stories) (1974)
- Os rios galegos (geography) (1976)

=== (in Spanish) ===
- Guia de Galicia (geography) (1926)
- Paisajes y problemas geográficos de Galicia (geography) (1928)
- Historia de la cultura gallega (history/anthropology) (1939)
- Las palmas del convento (novel) (1941).
- Vida del Doctor Don Marcelo Macías y García (novel) (1943)
- Adolescencia (novel) (1944).
- La vocación de Adrián Silva (novel) (1949).
- Las ciudades gallegas (geography) (1955)
- Geografía de España: presencia y potencia del suelo y del pueblo español (geography) (1955)
- Galicia: una cultura de Occidente (geography) (1975)

== See also ==
- Atlantic Europe
- Partido Galeguista (1931)
- Galician Statute of Autonomy (1936)
- Galicianism (Galicia)
- Xeración Nós
- University of Santiago de Compostela
- Celts in Galicia (Castro culture)
