= Xeración Nós =

Galician nationalist intellectual group

Xeración Nós was a Galician nationalist intellectual group of the 1920s, which followed from the cultural Rexurdimento movement of the 19th century. The name alludes to the Irish Sinn Féin ("We Ourselves"). The group's tradition was revived by the Xeración Galaxia in the 1950s.

== Gallery ==
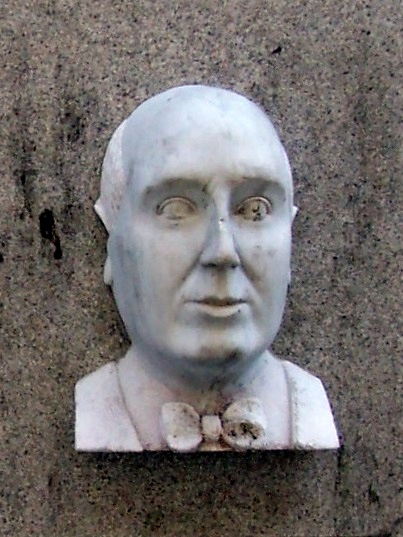
Commemorative plaque of Otero Pedrayo in Lugo

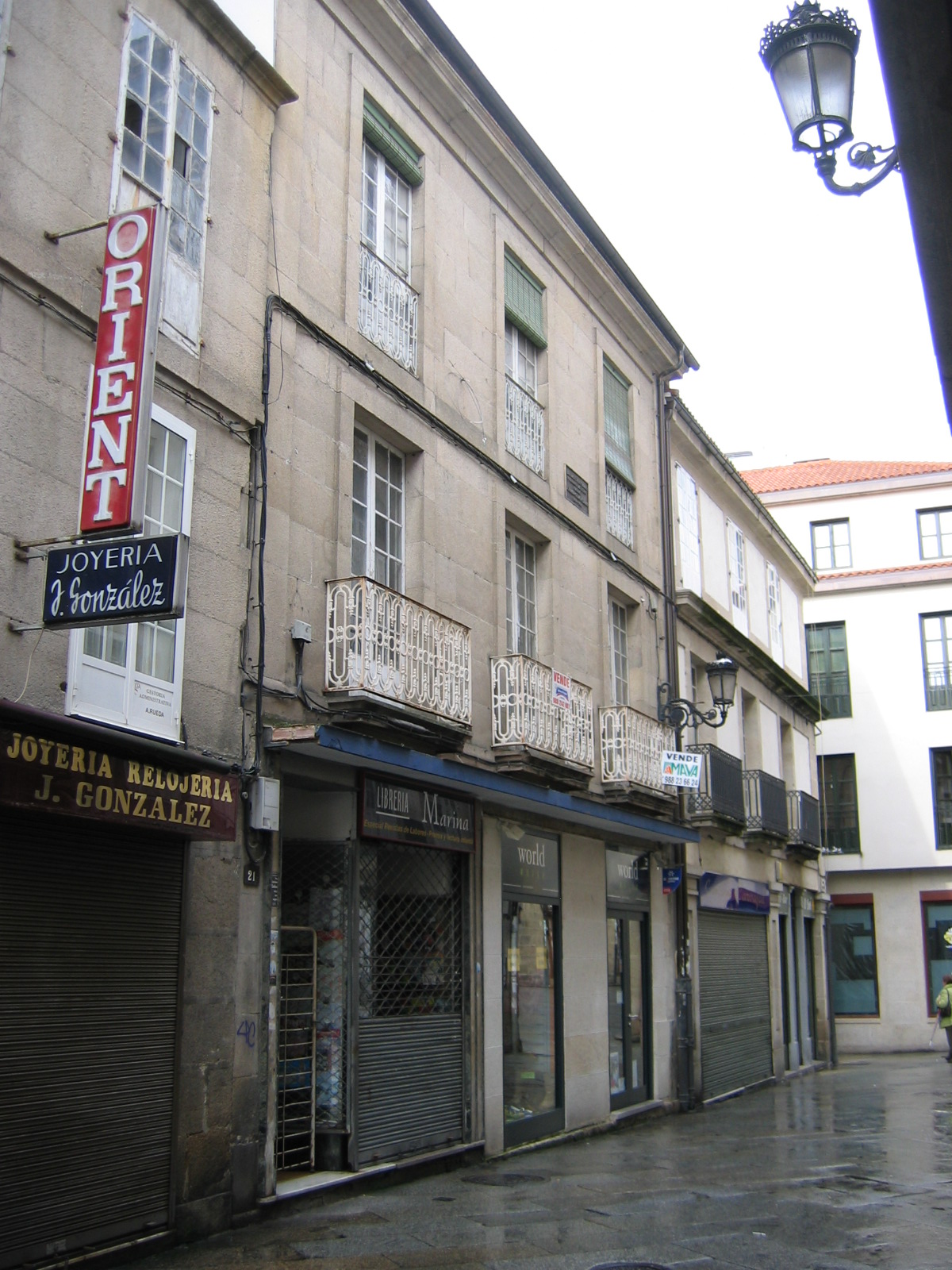
Birthplace of Vicente Risco (1st floor) and Otero Pedrayo (2nd floor)

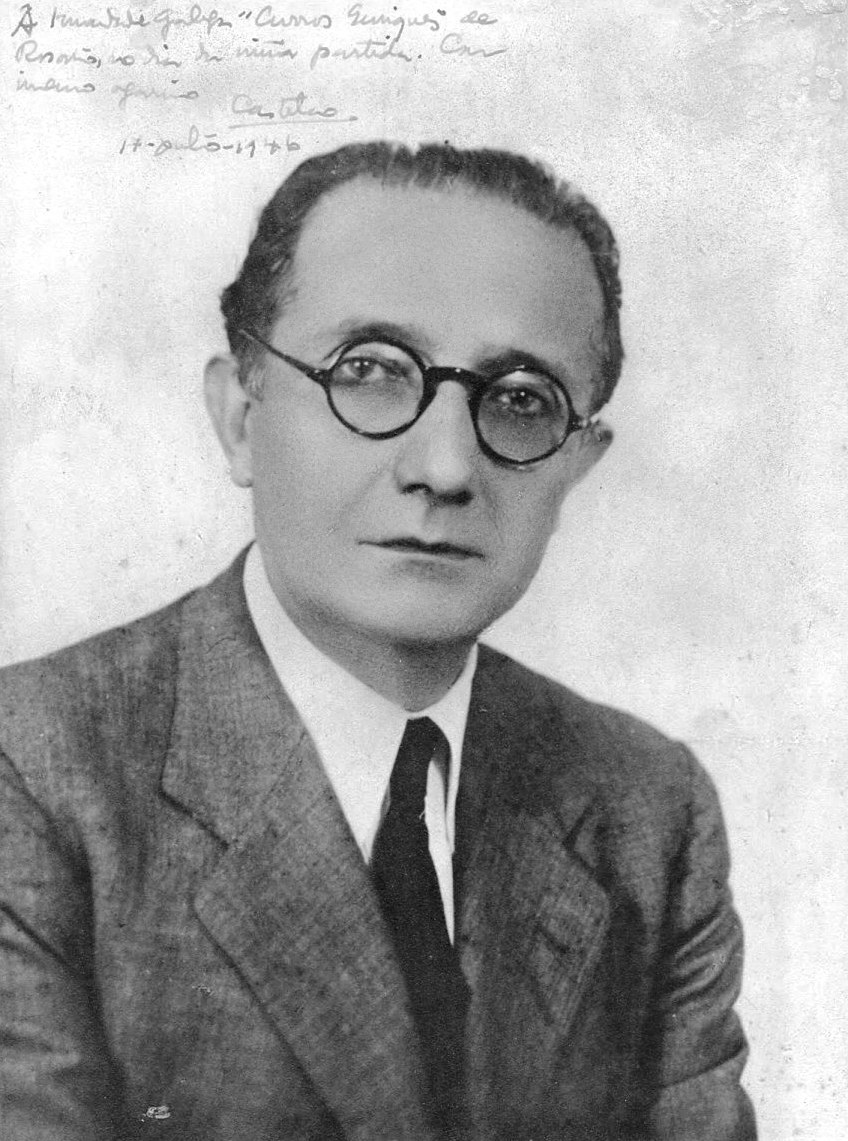
Castelao

== See also ==
- gl:Cenáculo ourensán
- gl:Literatura galega do século XX
