= Suso de Toro =

Spanish writer (born 1956)

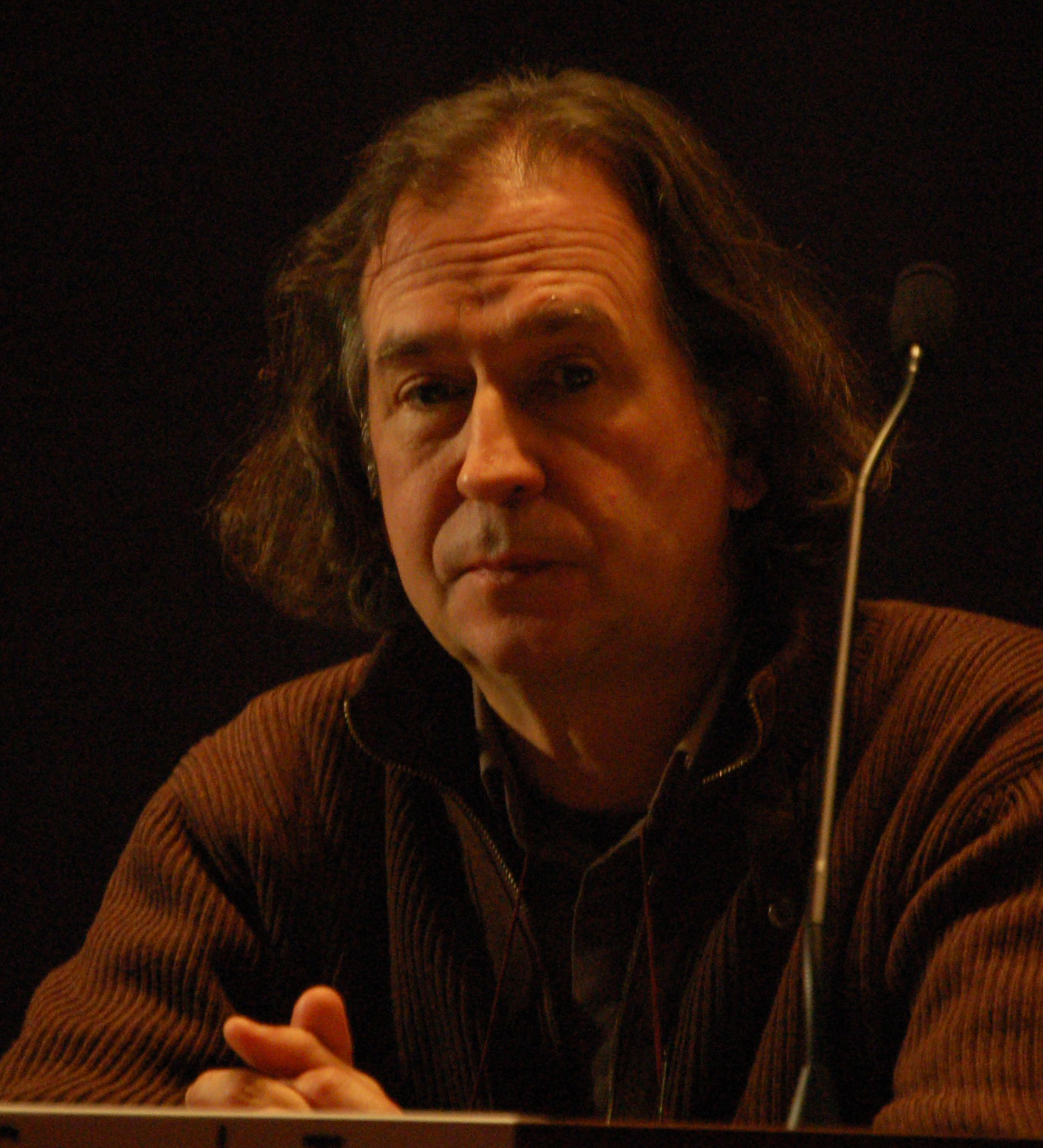
- Born: Xesús Miguel de Toro Santos; 10 January 1956 (age 70); Santiago de Compostela, Galicia, Spain
- Occupations: Novelist, playwright, scriptwriter
- Writing career
- Language: Galician

Xesús Miguel "Suso" de Toro Santos (born 10 January 1956) is a Spanish writer. A modern and contemporary arts graduate, he has published more than twenty novels and plays in Galician. He is a television scriptwriter and regular contributor to the press and radio. Suso de Toro writes in Galician and sometimes translates his own work into Spanish.

His works have been translated into several languages, and have been taught in European universities. There are plans to make three of his works into films: A Sombra Cazadora, Non Volvas, and Calzados Lola.

== Works ==
- Caixón desastre (1983)
- Polaroid (1986)
- Land Rover (1988)
- Ambulancia (1990)
- Tic-tac (1993)
- A Sombra Cazadora (1994) Edicións Xerais
- Conta Saldada (1996)
- Unha Rosa é unha Rosa (1997), theater
- Calzados Lola (1997)
- Círculo (1998)
- Non Volvas (2000) Edicións Xerais
- Trece badaladas (2002)
- El príncipe manco (2004)
- Morgun (2004)
- Home sen nome (2006)
- Sete Palabras (2009) Edicións Xerais; self-translated as Siete Palabras (2010) Alianza Editorial

== Journalism ==
- Parado na tormenta (1996)
- Eterno retorno (1996)
- O país da brétema (2000)
- A carreira do salmón (2001)
- Nunca mais Galiza á intemperie (2002)
- Españois todos: As cartas sobre a mesa (2004)
- Ten que doer: literatura e identidade (2004)
- Outra idea de España: Mar de fondo (2005)
- Madera de Zapatero (2005)
- Outra Galiza (2008)

== Awards ==
- Premio da Crítica Galicia
- Premio da Crítica de narrativa galega (twice)
- Premio Blanco Amor
- Premio Nacional de Narrativa
