= Ledicia Costas =

Spanish writer

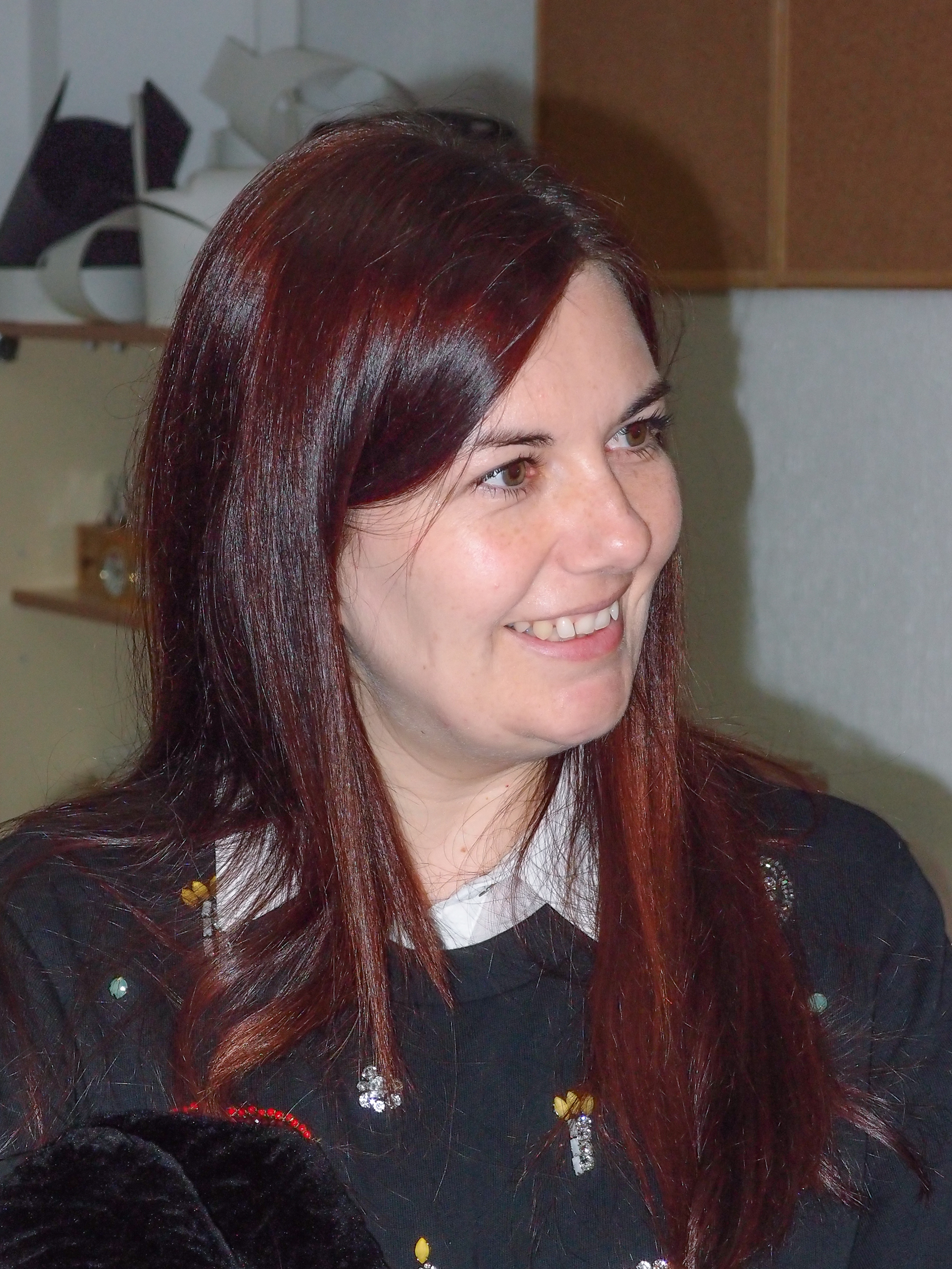
Ledicia Costas (2016)

Ledicia Costas Álvarez (born September 19, 1979 in Vigo) is a Spanish lawyer and writer who writes in Galician. In 2022, she was the first and only writer to receive the Spanish Lazarillo Award three times (in 2015, 2017 and 2022).

== Life and career ==
Even as a child, Costas wanted to become a writer. After graduating from high school, she studied law at the University of Vigo and worked as a lawyer for three years after earning her degree. At the same time, she was active as a writer of children’s and young adult books. In 2000, at the age of 21, she published her first work, Unha estrela no vento (in English, A Star in the Wind). After achieving success with additional works, she gave up her law practice to devote herself entirely to writing.

Costas was married to children’s and young adult author Miguel Ángel López González. He died in November 2023 at the age of 47 following a sudden heart attack. The couple had several daughters. Ledicia Costas lives in Vigo.

Ledicia Costas is the author of numerous books. In 2015, she won the National Prize for Children’s and Young Adult Literature for her work “Escarlatina, a cociñeira defunta” (in English: Scarlatina, the Deceased Cook). According to the jury, it is a humorous and groundbreaking work in the context of contemporary children’s and young adult literature, distinguished by its accessibility, its biting humor, and its ability to demystify the world of death. [3] The book has been translated into numerous languages, including Spanish, Catalan, English, Korean, Bulgarian, Italian, Romanian, Portuguese, and Persian.

Since 2015, Ledicia Costas has also been writing books for adults.

== Books for Adults ==
- Her first book for adults, An animal chamado néboa (English: An Animal Called Mist), was published in Galician in 2015 and in English in 2017 under the title An Animal Called Mist. It contains six short stories set around the time of the Second World War. She blends fiction and historical fact to explore themes of human cruelty during wartime. For this work, she received the Losada Diéguez Prize for Literary Creation in 2016.
- In 2019, she published her first novel for adults, Infamia (engl.: Shame), which was inspired by the murder of Marta del Castillo in 2009. The novel’s main character is Emma Cruz, a lawyer and law professor who travels to a fictional town in Galicia to investigate the disappearance of two sisters. The 2009 case caused a stir beyond Spain’s borders. Since the perpetrator confessed, he was convicted of murder, even though Marta’s body was never found. The case influenced Spanish criminal law,[8] and the media attention culminated in 2021 with the Netflix miniseries Where Is Marta? So far this book is available in Galician, Catalan and German.
- In 2021, she published the novel Golpes de luz, a sensitive and humorous novel about the secrets in the lives of three generations in rural Galicia. Drug trafficking in Galicia in the 1990s, caring for loved ones, and the search for the truth form the backdrop of this story. So far the book is available in its original language Galician and a translation by the author into Catalan.
- In 2024, she published Piel de cordero, the story of two women who are bound together for two centuries by the magical and unstoppable power of witchcraft. In the first part, Catalina—who belongs to a line of witches dating back to the final years of the Inquisition—grows up in Merlo in a doctor’s office where patients with a wide variety of ailments are treated. In the second part, Lola, a 21st-century woman in the midst of a crisis, comes into contact with forces she does not understand. So far the book is available in its original language Galician and a translation by the author into Castilian.

== Poetry ==
- The book Ultraluz, which can be read as the journey of Ledicia as a child toward her transformation into an artist, won the Galician PEN Club Award in 2022 for its Galician-language edition, and it brings together many of the recurring themes in Ledicia’s literary work: horror, death, and childhood.
- In 2023 Ultraluz was performed as a scenic production that blended poetry, through the voice of Ledicia Costas and music by Amaro Ferreiro and Sergio Martínez in Vigo, Galicia.

== Children's and Young Adult Literature ==
Since 2008, numerous children’s and young adult books have been published in various languages.

She has also written several young adult novels which have been published in English:

- A Star in the Wind (2000)
- Heart of Jupiter (2012), addressing the risks of online relationships
- Grey Enclosure (2014) talking about an army of wolf soldiers who invade City Vii to carry off those with disabilities
- Jules Verne and the Secret Life of Plant Women (2016) about the French author’s adventures in the city of Vigo.

Special mention should also be made of her three book series (published so far in Galician and Castilian):

- La Señorita Bubble (English: Miss Bubble the Inventor) (3 volumes since 2018)
- Los Minimuertos (English: The Little Undead), (4 volumes since 2021)
- Pimpollo (English: Pimpollo, the Dog from the Internet), (4 volumes since 2024)

== Illustrated Books ==
In 2024, she published a book titled Siete dientes de León (Spanish) or Sete dentes de león (Galician) in collaboration with illustrator David Sierra.

== Books with Co-Authors ==
Together with the Catalan author Pere Tobarula Martínez, Ledicia Costas wrote the following children’s books under the pen name Pereledi, all of which were illustrated by Andrés Meixide:

- Desaparizión (Galician, 2011) and Desaparissió (Catalan, 2012)
- Mortos de Ningures (Galician, 2011)
- Letras de xeo (Galician, 2012)
- Ouro Negro (Galician, 2013)

== Awards (selection) ==
- Winner of the Premio de Poesía do Concello de Marín, 2005
- Honorable mention in the GZ Crea Poetry Prize, for Aparición de triste
- Martín Sarmiento Prize for 7th and 8th Grade Students in Lower Secondary School, 2013, for Mortos de ningures, jointly with Pere Tobaruela
- 29th Merlin Prize for Children’s Literature, 2014, for Escarlatina, a cociñeira defunta
- Fervenzas Literary Prize for the Best Children’s Book of 2014, for Escarlatina, a cociñeira defunta
- Spanish Lazarillo Literary Prize for Children’s and Young Adult Literature 2015 for Escarlatina, a cociñeira defunta
- 2015 Lazarillo Prize for Literary Achievement for Jules Verne e a vida secreta das Mulleres Planta. Also for this work: 2016 Fervenzas Prize for Best Young Adult Book, 2016 Fervenzas Prize for Best Book Cover by LIX, Gala do Libro Galego Prize (Children’s/Young Adult Literature)
- 2016 Antón Losada Diéguez Prize for Literary Achievement for Un animal chamado néboa
- White Ravens list for Verne y la vida secreta de las mujeres
- Winner of the 2017 Lazarillo Prize for A balada dos unicornios, jointly with Rafael Salmerón
- Fervenzas Literary Prize for Best Children’s Book of 2017, for A señorita Bubble
- Kelvin Prize 505 for the Spanish edition of A balada dos unicornios, awarded as the best Spanish-language young adult novel. Celsius 232 Horror, Fantasy, and Science Fiction Festival in Avilés, 2019
- Galician Literature Prize 2020
- Merlin Prize 2021 for O neno de lume
- Winner of the Lazarillo Prize for A lebre mecánica in 2022
- Afundación Poetry Prize for Ultraluz in 2022
- 2025 Zenda Prize for Children’s and Young Adult Literature 2023–2024 for Siete dientes de león
- Barco de Vapor Prize for Children’s Literature 2025 for Feriópolis
