= Xurxo Borrazás =

Spanish writer and translator (born 1963)

- Born: Xurxo Borrazás Fariña; 6 August 1963 (age 63); Carballo, Spain
- Education: Universidade de Santiago de Compostela
- Occupation: Writer
- Years active: 1991–present

Xurxo Borrazás Fariña (born 6 August 1963) is a Spanish writer in Galician and translator from English to Galician.

== Biography ==
He was born in Carballo, Spain, and earned a degree in English philology from the Universidade de Santiago de Compostela. At this time, he began to write poetry, and then continued writing narrative fiction. He has translated Tropic of Cancer by Henry Miller (for Galaxia) and The Sound and the Fury by William Faulkner into Galician. His fiction has been defined as experimental and transgressive. Some of his novels have been translated into Spanish, English, Russian and Portuguese. Several stories have appeared in English in the anthology From the Beginning of the Sea published in Oxford by Foreign Demand. He has lectured at Spanish and British universities and writes articles on the fields of culture and politics for Galician press.

== Works ==
=== Novels ===
- Cabeza de chorlito (1991)
- Vicious (Criminal) (1994), English translation 2015
- Eu é (1996)
- O desintegrista (1999)
- Na maleta (2000)
- Pensamentos Impuros (2002)
- Ser ou non (2004)
- Costa norte/ZFK (2008)
- Covalladas. Prosa vertical (2010)

=== Short stories ===
Collections:

- Contos malvados (1998), collection of 13 short stories
- Brevedume (2019), collection of aphorisms

=== Non-fiction ===
- Arte e parte (2007), essays

== Awards ==
- 1994 Premio de la Crítica de narrativa gallega, for Vicious
- 1995 Premio San Clemente, for Vicious
- 2001 Premio Antón Losada Diéguez in category Creación literaria, for Na maleta
- 2008 Premio de la Crítica de Galicia in category Ensayo y Pensamiento, for Arte e parte
