= Editorial Galaxia =

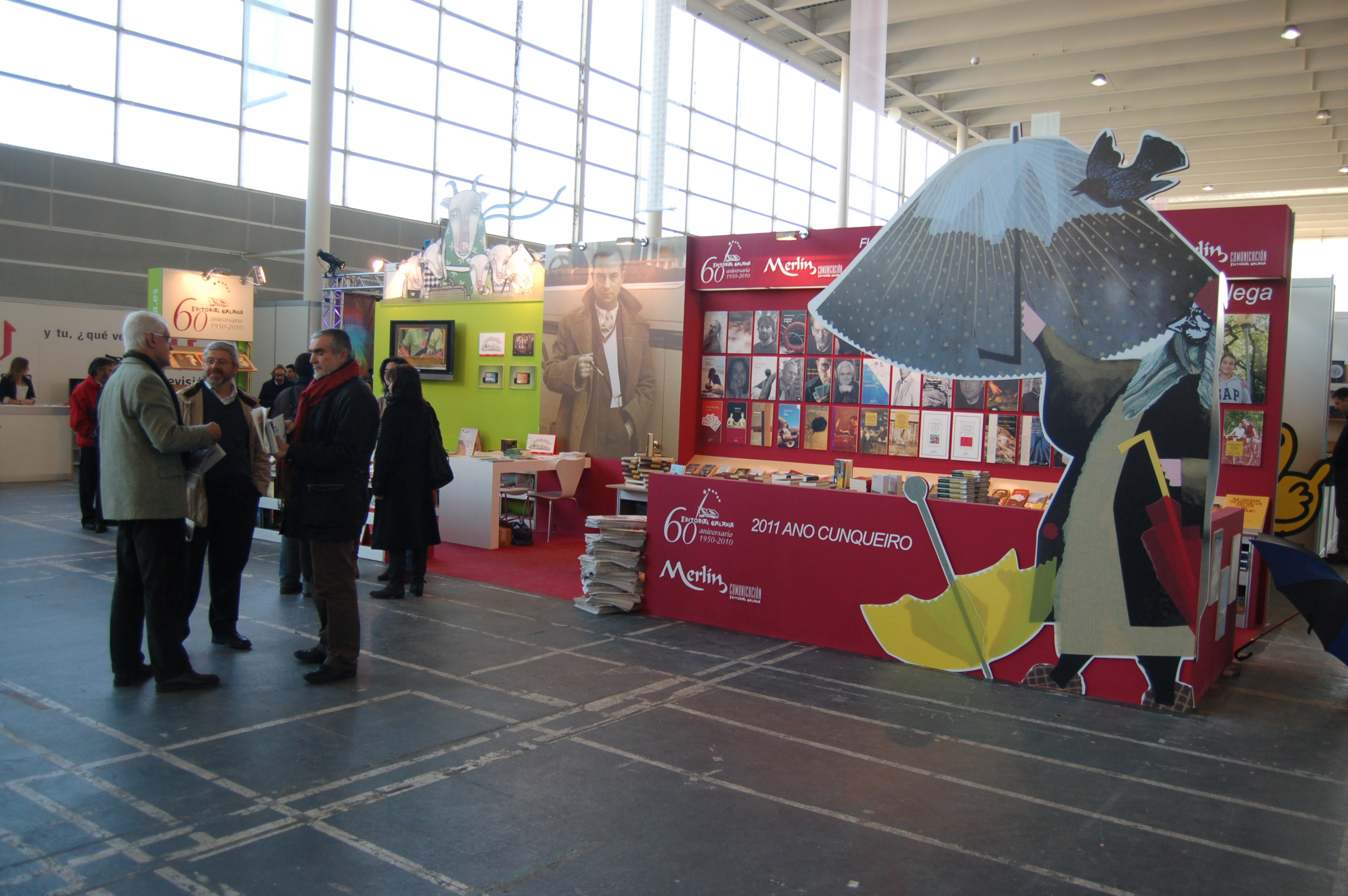

The Xeración Galaxia (Galaxy Generation) were a group of Galician language writers centred on the Editorial Galaxia (founded 1950) which was established to publish and translate modern texts that would develop Galician national literature. The name echoes that of the 1920s intellectual group Xeración Nós ("Generation We Ourselves") who promoted Galician culture in the 1920s.
