= Statute of Autonomy of Galicia of 1936 =

Estatuto de Galicia (pdf).

The Statute of Autonomy of Galicia of 1936 (Galician: Estatuto de autonomía de Galicia) was a statute of autonomy for Galicia. It was voted in referendum and presented to the Spanish Parliament. Yet, it could never be implemented because of the Spanish Civil War (1936–1939) and subsequent Francoist Spain (1939–1977). The 1936 statute was drafted by the Partido Galeguista (Galicianist Party), and it is the historical precedent of the current Statute of Autonomy of Galicia of 1981.

== Origins ==
Galician nationalists of the early 20th century, namely those around the Partido Galeguista, had considered a number of options regarding the relationship between Galicia and Spain, ranging from regional autonomy to total independence. During the Spanish Second Republic (1931–1939) a number of intellectuals proposed the formation of a federal State, where the different regions and nations of Spain could benefit from autonomy and decentralization. With that idea in mind, the Partido Galeguista, founded in 1931, promoted the development of a Galician Statute of Autonomy, based on the old Galicianist ideals and the modern Galician nationalism.

== Drafting the document ==
In 1931, shortly after the establishment of the Spanish Second Republic, the Seminario de Estudos Galegos (Galician Studies Seminar) presented an early draft for a Statute of Autonomy. The draft had been prepared by Valentín Paz Andrade, Lois Tobío Fernández, Ricardo Carballo Calero and Vicente Risco. It stated:

Article 1. Galicia is a free State within the Spanish Federal Republic

Article 2. The official languages in the Galician State are, indistinctly, Galician and Castilian
Civil servants must know the Galician language
Article 3. The national colours of Galicia are white and blue
Article 4. The territory of Galicia embraces the four old provinces of A Coruña, Lugo, Pontevedra and Ourense
Article 5. Any neighbouring territory may join Galicia if that is approved by two thirds of their population (...)
Article 6. A Galician citizen is:

a) Anyone born of Galician parents in Galician territory
b) Anyone born of Galician father or mother, even if born abroad, if that is their wish (...)
c) Anyone not born in Galicia and/or without Galician ascendancy if they are officially residing in Galicia

Building on that, a more elaborated draft arrived in 1932, when the Mayor of Santiago de Compostela, Raimundo López Pol, called for a meeting of all the Galician municipalities to discuss the text. That first meeting took place in Compostela on July 3. The editing committee was composed by Manuel Lugrís, Alexandre Bóveda and Salvador Cabeza de León. They wrote a Statute containing 49 articles. It was divided in six parts: 1) Prologue; 2) Regional powers; 3) Faculties and abilities of the region; 4) Regional tax and revenue; 5) General remarks; 6) Temporary dispositions.

This project defined Galicia as a democratic autonomous region within the Spanish State, with the aspiration of transforming the State into a federal republic. It established both Galician and Spanish as official languages. Most significantly, it granted the Galician government a number of powers, including the financial system (management and control of taxes and the economy), with the possibility to nationalize. It also established the functioning of the Parliament, the electoral system, and the role and functions of the President of Galicia.

== Ratification ==
Between 17 and 19 December 1932, the final text was submitted to the vote. It obtained the support of 77 per cent of the Galician municipal representatives, counting for 84.7 per cent of the population. However, political instability postponed the ratification of the Statute by the Spanish government. Following the victory of the Frente Popular (Popular Front) in the February 1936 elections, the Galicianists could proceed again with their project. Yet, the fact that a number of members of the Partido Galeguista had joined the Frente Popular for the elections provoked internal tensions, namely from the right-wing members, who left the party. Nonetheless, they would still support the Statute and ask for a "yes" vote in the referendum to come.

The campaign for the Statute referendum was intense and, finally, on 28 June 1936, Galicians were called to general vote. The turnout was 74.56 per cent (a very high figure for that time), with 993,351 votes in favour and 6,161 against. On 15 July 1936 Gómez Román, secretary of the Partido Galeguista, and Castelao, member of the Spanish Parliament for the Partido Galeguista/Frente Popular, submitted the Galician Statute of Autonomy to the Spanish Parliament. However, the start of the Civil War delayed the process. The Republican Parliament, based in Catalonia because of the War, eventually discussed the Statute on 1 February 1938. The Statute was only officially passed in 1945 by a Republican parliamentary commission in exile, namely in Mexico. That is to say, it was a symbolic gesture since the Statute could never be implemented.

== Legacy ==
The 1936 Statute of Autonomy of Galicia, although never implemented, was a fundamental piece of legislation for the future of Galicia. With the end of Francoist Spain (1977) and subsequent Spanish transition to democracy and passing of the Spanish Constitution (1978), a process of devolution took place in Spain. Galicia gained the rank of pre-autonomous community in 1979, achieving full status in 1981 with the passing of the current Statute of Autonomy. In other words, the Statute of Autonomy of Galicia of 1981 is seen as many as the heir of the 1936 text.

== See also ==
- Statute of Autonomy of Galicia of 1981
- Autonomous Community
- Partido Galeguista
- Alexandre Bóveda
- Castelao
- Galician nationalism
- Galicianism

== See also ==
=== Related articles ===
- Tertulia Monument (Literary Circle in Modern Coffee)

=== External links ===
- Part of the 1936 Statute, commented by Castelao (in Galician)
