= NÓS =

Online lifestyle magazine in the Irish language

- Editor: Conor Torbóid
- Former editors: Tomaí Ó Conghaile (2008-2018); Maitiú Ó Coimín (2018-2023)
- Categories: Music, movies, current affairs, Culture, travel, design, activism
- Frequency: Daily (online)
- Publisher: Rua Media
- Founder: Tomaí Ó Conghaile
- First issue: 17 March 2008; 18 years ago
- Country: Ireland
- Language: Irish
- Website: www.nos.ie

NÓS (Irish pronunciation: [n̪ˠoːsˠ], meaning "custom" or "trend") is an Irish language culture and lifestyle magazine.

The magazine covers topics such as music, film, travel, design, activism and current affairs. It was launched by Tomaí Ó Conghaile, former assistant editor of Lá Nua and television and radio presenter with BBC NI, and relies on a large network of contributors throughout Ireland and abroad.

NÓS has received a number of awards for its contemporary design and content, including Best Irish Language Website at the Irish Web Awards in 2009. It was also the first and only Irish language publication to be nominated at the Irish Magazine Awards.

== History ==
Launched online on 17 March 2008 during Seachtain na Gaeilge, it began publishing a glossy print edition in November of the same year. Run on a voluntary basis, this full-colour monthly edition continued for over a year before NÓS was printed as an entertainment supplement with Irish language weekly newspaper, Gaelscéal. In July 2013, NÓS was relaunched with a new design and was circulated monthly, with extra content updated more frequently online.

In January 2015 NÓS launched a new website, updated daily with new content and is now solely available online.

Articles in the magazine are normally written in the Irish language, although a number of articles have also appeared in Scottish Gaelic and Manx.

On 1 February 2018, the editorship of the magazine changed hands to Maitiú Ó Coimín. Conor Torbóid became editor in 2023.

== See also ==
- BLOC
- Raidió Rí-Rá
- Y Selar; Golwg (Welsh magazines)
- List of Irish-language media
- List of Celtic-language media
