= Antón Villar Ponte =

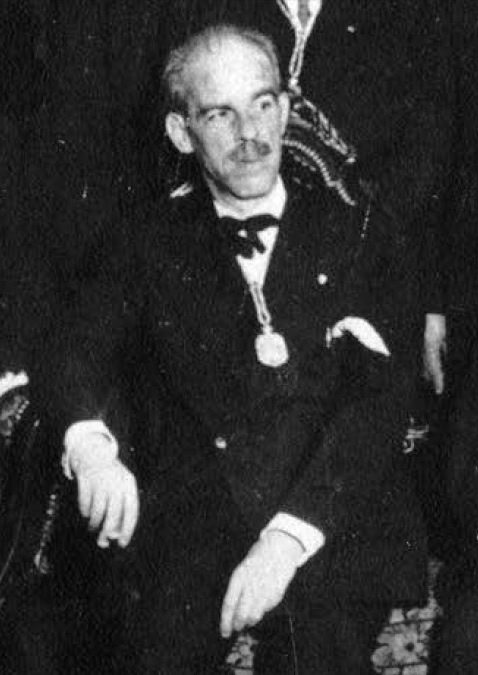
Villar Ponte, 1934.

Antón Villar Ponte (2 October 1881, Viveiro - 4 March 1936, A Coruña). He was one of the most important galicianists before the civil war. As a journalist he worked in A Nosa Terra, Nós, La Voz de Galicia, El Pueblo Gallego, and El Noroste.

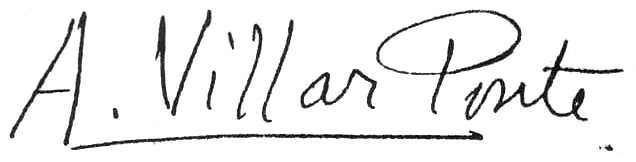

== Works ==
- Do caciquismo: A patria do labrego (1905)
- Nacionalismo gallego. Nuestra afirmación regional (1916)
- Os nosos valores (1920). Sociedade Económica de Santiago, A Nosa Terra, nº 120.
- Da superstición. Entre dous abismos (1920)
- Do cosmopolitismo, do universalismo e da mansedume galega (1921), "La Oliva", Vigo, A Nosa Terra nº 139.
- O sentimiento liberal na Galiza, RAG, 1934.
- Da emigración: Almas mortas: novela dialogada cómico tráxica en tres estancias (Editorial Céltiga, 1922)
- O Mariscal (1926; with Ramón Cabanillas).
- Teatro galego: tríptigo (Nós, 1928). (Do caciquismo: a patria do labrego; Da emigración: almas mortas; Da superstición: entre dous abismos).
- Os evanxeos da risa absoluta: anunciación do antiquixote. Folk-drama da sinxeleza campesina (Nós, 1934).
- Nouturnio de medo e morte, bárbara anécdota realista en dous tempos (sin literatura) que puido andar nos romances dos cegos (Nós, 1935)
- Escolma de artigos nazonalistas (1936)
- Pensamento e sementeira. Leiciós de patriotismo galego (1971), Salvador Lorenzana, Ediciones Galicia, Centro Gallego de Buenos Aires.
- Baramendi González, J. & Monterroso Devesa, X. M.ª (1991) Obra política de Ramón Villar Ponte. Edicións do Castro.
- Ínsua López, E. X. & Nuevo Cal, C. (2003). O primeiro Antón Villar Ponte: achegamento ao período de formación do fundador das irmandades da fala (1881-1908). Caixa Galicia. ISBN 9788495491855.
- Ínsua López, E. X. (2006). Antón Villar Ponte e a Academia Galega: contributos para a historia crítica dunha institución centenaria. Edicións do Cumio. ISBN 9788482893617.
