= Irmandades da Fala =

- Founded: 1916
- Dissolved: 1936
- Newspaper: A Nosa Terra
- Ideology: Galician nationalism
- Political position: Big tent
- Colors: Blue and white.

The Irmandades da Fala (English: "Brotherhood of the Language") was a Galician nationalist organization active between 1916 and 1936. It was the first political organization of Galicia that used only the Galician language.

== Background ==
Aurelio Ribalta, a Galician writer living in Madrid, called for the protection of the Galician language in 1915. On 5 January 1916, Antón Vilar Ponte started a campaign for the establishment of a League of Friends of the Galician Language in the newspaper La Voz de Galicia and in March 1916 he published Galician Nationalism (Notes for a Book): Our Regional Affirmation, where he supported the protection, dignification and use of the Galician language.

The proposal was supported by leaders of different ideological persuasions. The most important of these were Antón Losada Diéguez and the Traditionalists and the Liberal Democrats. Camilo Buenaventura Díaz Baliño, Indalecio Díaz Baliño, Lolita Díaz Baliño and Ramiro Díaz Baliño were all members.

== Political program ==
In the congress of November 1918 in the city of Lugo, they established their program:

1. Primary objectives:
  1. Complete autonomy for Galicia.
  2. Municipal autonomy.
  3. Entry of Galicia into the League of Nations.
  4. Federal union with Portugal.
2. Objectives for Galicia:
  1. The legislative power to be in a Galician Parliament, elected by the people.
  2. The judicial power to always be exercised by the Galician people.
  3. Galicia to have its own tax laws, without the intervention of central government.
  4. Galician and Spanish to be the official languages in Galicia.
  5. Equal rights for women and men.
  6. Suppression of the Provincial Deputations.

== Bibliography ==
- Beramendi, X.G.; Núñez Seixas, X.M. (1996). O nacionalismo galego (in Galician). Vigo: A Nosa Terra.
- Beramendi, X.G. (2007). De provincia a nación. Historia do galeguismo político (in Galician). Vigo: Xerais.
