= Camilo Díaz Baliño =

Spanish writer, artist and politician (1889–1936)

Camilo Díaz
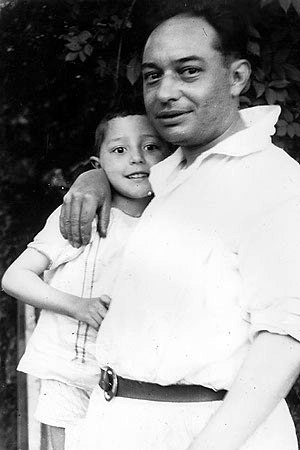
- Díaz Baliño with his son Isaac in 1925
- Born: Camilo Buenaventura Díaz Baliño; July 14, 1889; Ferrol, Galicia, Spain
- Died: August 14, 1936 (aged 47); Cerceda, Galicia, Spain
- Occupations: writer, politician, and graphic artist

Camilo Buenaventura Díaz Baliño (1889–1936) was a Spanish writer, politician, Galician intellectual and graphic artist. He was a member of the Royal Economic Society of Friends of the Country of Santiago, the Irmandades da Fala, the Seminar of Galician Studies, and of the Galicianist Party. He was executed by Franco's Nationalist faction at the beginning of the Spanish Civil War.

== Background ==
Along with the artists Indalecio Díaz Baliño, Lolita Díaz Baliño and Ramiro Díaz Baliño, he was a founding member of the "Brotherhood of the Language" (Galician: Irmandades da Fala) in the province of Province of A Coruña.

He was a writer and was published in the Galician press of the time, especially in A Nosa Terra. He hosted various meetings in his home, related to the activities of the Irmandades da Fala, and it was frequented by several Galician intellectuals of the time, including Ramón Cabanillas, Castelao and Otero Pedrayo.

He was executed around August 14 by the Nationalists at the beginning of the Spanish Civil War.

== Personal life ==
In 1909 he married Antonia Pardo Méndez, with whom he had three children: María del Milagro Antonia "Marujita", Mercedes "Chita" (1916) and Isaac. Isaac Díaz Pardo, was founder of the fifth era of the Royal Factory of Sargadelos and the Ediciós do Castro.

Antonia, from an anarchist family, shared Camilo's Galician ideology and was also affiliated with the Irmandades da Fala. After her husband was shot, she suffered from cancer and died, in December 1938.

== Legacy ==
His son Isaac gathered his work at the Instituto Galego de Información and belonging to the Sargadelos Group. The collection was subsequently transferred, for its classification, custody and dissemination, to the Library of Galicia at the City of Culture of Galicia and can be consulted in the virtual library Galiciana. It is made up of around 200 photographs, stories, a small library and then albums that cover all of his professional activities in the Americas, in addition to over a hundred letters and personal documents.

In 1959, the city of Ferrol placed his bronze bust in the Canton of Molíns. In the square of Santiago de Compostela, in front of the bus station, and on the street of Oleiros, they placed his name. The writer Manuel Rivas uses the story Díaz Baliño in the prison of Pazo de Raxoi in his book The Carpenter's Pencil, a novel that would be made into a film of the same name, released in 2003, directed by Antón Reixa. In 2018 the "Uselle o Día da illustration" was dedicated to Díaz Baliño.

== Works ==
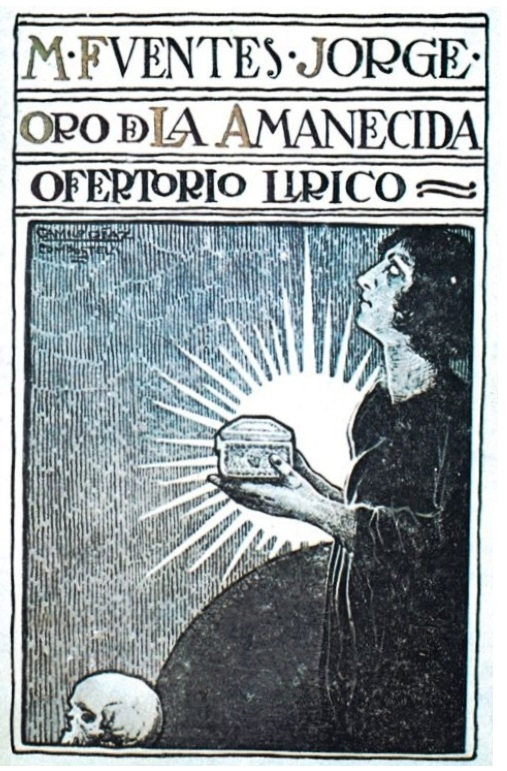
Work by Diaz

- Conto de guerra, 1928 (narrativa).

In the 1920s, Díaz Baliño received a commission to design a nativity scene for the parish church of Santa Marta de Ortigueira, which was completed in 1924. It is a nativity scene of considerable dimensions, delimited by canvases supported by wooden frames, which appears to be a stage. with various plans. The decorations reflect images of ancient Egypt, but they also include landscapes of Ortegal, his country's land that Camilo himself visited on various occasions. Later he also designed the backgrounds of the Grande Obra nativity scene in Atocha in Coruña. Later he also designed the backgrounds of the Nativity scene of the Grande Obra de Atocha in Coruña Coruña.

== See also ==
- Mario Granell
- List of people executed by Francoist Spain
