= Sargadelos =

Sargadelos may refer to:

== Places ==
- Sargadelos, a parish in the municipality of Cervo, Lugo, Galicia, Spain

== Industry ==
- Sargadelos (ceramics), a Galician ceramics and porcelain manufacturer founded in 1806
- Cerámicas do Castro, the ceramics complex at O Castro de Samoedo, Sada, part of the Grupo Sargadelos

== History ==
- Antonio Raimundo Ibáñez, the Marquis of Sargadelos, founder of the original Sargadelos ironworks and ceramics factory

== See also ==
- Laboratorio de Formas, the cultural initiative that revived the Sargadelos ceramics factory in the 1960s
- Isaac Díaz Pardo, ceramicist and driving force behind the modern Sargadelos
