= Tsvetanka Elenkova =

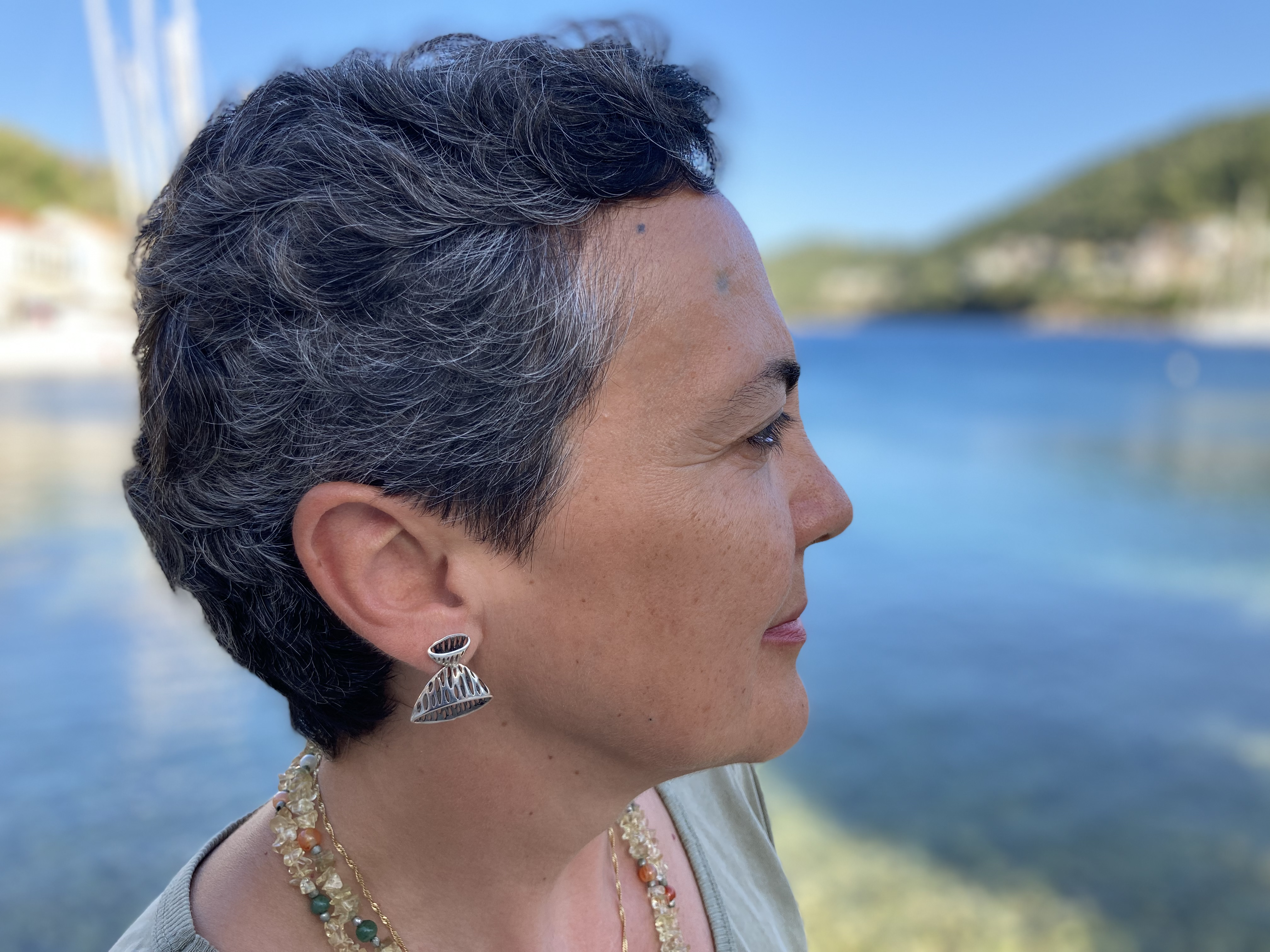
- In Ithaca, June 2022
- Born: Цветанка Еленкова; 1968 (age 57–58); Sofia, Bulgaria
- Occupations: Writer, translator, publisher

Tsvetanka Elenkova (Bulgarian: Цветанка Еленкова; born 1968) is a Bulgarian poet, essayist, editor and translator. She is editorial director of the publishing house Small Stations Press, which publishes in both English and Bulgarian. Her work has been translated into more than twenty languages and has appeared in magazines like Poetry Review and The Massachusetts Review. English, French, Spanish and Serbian editions of her works are available.

== Life ==
Born in Sofia in 1968, Elenkova attended Russian-language school and graduated in economics from the University of National and World Economy. She worked as a journalist for Nova Television and was on the editorial board of the magazines Ah, Maria, the first private literary magazine after the fall of communism, and Helios, the magazine of the International Writers and Translators Centre of Rhodes, for which she was the Association of Bulgarian Writers’ representative. She was editor-in-chief of the magazine Europe 2001, a socio-cultural magazine with issues dedicated to countries from all around the world.

Since 2007, Elenkova has been editorial director of the publishing house Small Stations Press, which publishes literature in the original language and in translation in both English and Bulgarian. In 2018, she completed a master's degree in Theology at Sofia University “St. Kliment Ohridski”, where she is currently a doctoral student with a thesis on the poetry of Gregory of Nazianzus.

Elenkova is married to the English writer, editor and translator Jonathan Dunne.

== Work ==
Elenkova has written six poetry collections and two books of essays in the Bulgarian language.

Translations of her work have appeared in more than twenty languages. In English, her work has been published in the following magazines: Absinthe, International Literary Quarterly, Modern Poetry in Translation, New Humanist, Odyssey, Orient Express, Poem, Poetry Review, Strands Lit Sphere, The Massachuesetts Review, Zoland. Her poem “The Train” was included in the special sixtieth-anniversary of the US literary magazine The Massachusetts Review: And There Will Be Singing: An Anthology of International Writing. Her poem “Cherni Vrah” was included in the UNESCO anthology Happiness: The Delight-Tree.

Elenkova has herself translated authors such as Raymond Carver, Rosalía de Castro, Bogomil Gjuzel, Lois Pereiro, Manuel Rivas and Fiona Sampson into Bulgarian.

Of her poetry from The Seventh Gesture, Sarah Crown writes in Poetry Review: “There’s a lovely clarity to her thoughts, which combines with the warmth of her delivery to produce an unusual, uplifting collection.”; John Taylor writes in Absinthe: “Her prose poems function like equations... After Elenkova’s poetic calculus has done its job (and oblique transitions play a key role in the inner logical apparatus), the result, which is usually a subdued surprise ending, often represents a matter of existential import that cannot be deduced from the initial context and that will linger long in the reader’s mind.”; Manuel Rivas writes in his introduction to the Spanish edition of The Seventh Gesture that Elenkova's poetry is in “that point of the Spirit, in the epicenter of the creative earthquake, where the surrealists found that opposites merge, where what is said and felt contradicts.”; Carlos Olivares writes in La Razón: “This book is the vertical memory of the human epidermis.”.

Tom Sleigh writes in the introduction to the US edition of Crookedness: “The essence of these poems is a prayerful relation to the world, but without being directed to God, or asking for something in return for her belief. All the poet asks is that language, as it makes its way to the page, remain vital and alert, as it embraces human conundrums and paradoxes.”; Fiona Sampson writes in the introduction to the UK edition of Crookedness: “It is not Gerard Manley Hopkins’s search for ‘inscape’, but instead an apprehension that from moment to moment forms itself into symbolic codes – and then releases those codes into the material, sensual world.”

In 2019, Elenkova received the prestigious award Pencho's Oak from the Bulgarian critic Svetlozar Igov for the body of her work. In 2022 she received English PEN Award for her book Magnification Forty.

== Awards ==
=== Nominations ===
- Hristo G. Danov National Award for Translation 2000 for Speaking of Siva
- Ivan Nikolov National Prize for Poetry 2011 for Crookedness
- Ivan Nikolov National Prize for Poetry 2019 for The Seventh Gesture II
- National Poetry Award Nikolai Kanchev 2019 for The Seventh Gesture II

=== Won ===
- Literary Award Pencho's Oak 2019 for the body of her work
- English PEN Award 2022 for Magnification Forty

== Bibliography ==
=== In Bulgarian language ===
==== Poetry ====
- Кладите на легиона (The Stakes of the Legion), Sofia: Nava, 1995, 37 p. ISBN 954-8392-08-9
- Амфиполис на деветте пътя (Amphipolis of the Nine Roads), Sofia: Nov Zlatorog, 1999, 57 p. ISBN 954-492-127-3
- Седмият жест (The Seventh Gesture), Sofia: Zaharii Stoyanov, 2005, 53 p. ISBN 954-07-2115-6
- Изкривяване (Crookedness), Sofia: Stigmati, 2011, 73 p. ISBN 978-954-336-124-3 [16][17]
- Увеличение четиридесет (Magnification Forty), Sofia: Ergo, 2015, 107 p. ISBN 978-954-8689-78-6 [21]
- Седмият жест II (The Seventh Gesture II), Sofia: VS Publishing, 2019, 98 p. ISBN 978-619-7390-03-2 [22]

==== Essay ====
- Времето и връзката. Девет есета за Балканите и др. (Time and Relation: Ten Essays about the Balkans and Others), Sofia: Small Stations Press, 2007, 80 p. ISBN 978-954-384-002-1
- Български фрески: празник на корена (Bulgarian Frescoes: Feast of the Root), Sofia: Omophor, 2013, 118 p. ISBN 978-954-2972-13-6

=== Translations of Elenkova’s work ===
==== Into English ====
The Seventh Gesture

- The Seventh Gesture. Translated by Jonathan Dunne, Bristol: Shearsman Books, 2010, 89 p. ISBN 978-1-84861-084-2

Crookedness

- Crookedness. Translated by Jonathan Dunne, Huntington Beach: Tebot Bach, 2013, 61 p. ISBN 978-1-893670-95-2
- Crookedness. Translated by Jonathan Dunne, Second Edition. Bristol: Shearsman Books, 2019, 77 p. ISBN 978-1-84861-686-8

==== Into French ====
Le Septième geste (The Seventh Gesture)

- Le Septième geste. Translated by Krassimir Kavaldjiev, Vayrac: Tertium Éditions, 2018, 90 p. ISBN 978-2-490429-02-8 [15]

Distorsion (Crookedness)

- Distorsion. Translated by Krassimir Kavaldjiev, Amiens: Corps Puce, 2018, 85 p., ISBN 978-2-352811-10-7

==== Into Spanish ====
El séptimo gesto (The Seventh Gesture)

- El séptimo gesto. Bilingual edition. Translated by Reynol Pérez Vázquez, Madrid: Vaso Roto, 2021, 189 p. ISBN 978-84-123598-0-0

==== Into Serbian ====
Ране од слободе (The Seventh Gesture)

- Ране од слободе (Wounds of Freedom, selection from The Seventh Gesture). Translated by Velemir Kostov, Kraljevo: Povelja, 2009, 33 p. ISSN 1452-3531

=== Translations by Tsvetanka Elenkova ===
- Слова за Шива (Speaking of Siva): Medieval Indian poets, poetry, Sofia: АБ, 2000, 121 p. ISBN 954-9885-97-6
- Джонатан Дън, Въпреки това (Jonathan Dunne, Even Though That). (co-translation with Rada Panchovska), poetry, Sofia: Proxima-RP, 2004, 79 p. ISBN 954-90660-7-X
- Реймънд Карвър, Късмет (Raymond Carver, Luck), poetry, Sofia: Small Stations Press, 2008, 95 p. ISBN 978-954-384-003-8.
- Фиона Сампсън, Дистанцията между нас (Fiona Sampson, The Distance Between Us), poetry, Sofia: Balkani, 2008, 107 p. ISBN 978-954-944-656-2
- Богомил Гюзел, Остров на сушата (Bogomil Gjuzel, Island in Land), (co-translation with Dimitar Hristov), poetry, Sofia: Balkani, 2010, 310 p. ISBN 978-954-944-674-6
- Лоис Перейро, Събрани стихотворения (Lois Pereiro, Collected Poems), poetry, Sofia: Small Stations Press, 2013, 201 p. ISBN 978-954-384-020-5.
- Розалия де Кастро, Галисийски песни (Rosalía de Castro, Galician Songs), poetry, Sofia: Small Stations Press, 2014, 182 p. ISBN 978-954-384-026-7
- Мануел Ривас, Изчезването на снега и други стихотворения (Manuel Rivas, The Disappearance of Snow and Other Poems), poetry, Sofia: Small Stations Press, 2015, 166 p. ISBN 978-954-384-043-4
- Гьокченур Ч., Паметник на неизразимото (Gokcenur. C., A Monument to the Impossibility of Utterance), (co-translation with Lyudmila Mindova), poetry, Sofia: Small Stations Press, 2016, 93 p. ISBN 978-954-384-048-9
- Чус Пато, Левиатан и други истории (Chus Pato, Leviatan and Other Stories), poetry, essay, Sofia: Small Stations Press, 2016, 205 p. ISBN 978-954-384-057-1
- Розалия де Кастро, Нови листа (Rosalia de Castro, New Leaves), poetry, Sofia: Small Stations Press, 2017, 278 p. ISBN 978-954-384-078-6
- Фиона Сампсън, Колсхил (Fiona Sampson, Coleshill), poetry, Sofia: Small Stations Press, 2019, 67 p. ISBN 978-954-384-097-7
