= Casa do Cabido =

Historic house in Galicia, Spain

Coordinates: 42°52′47″N 8°32′40″W

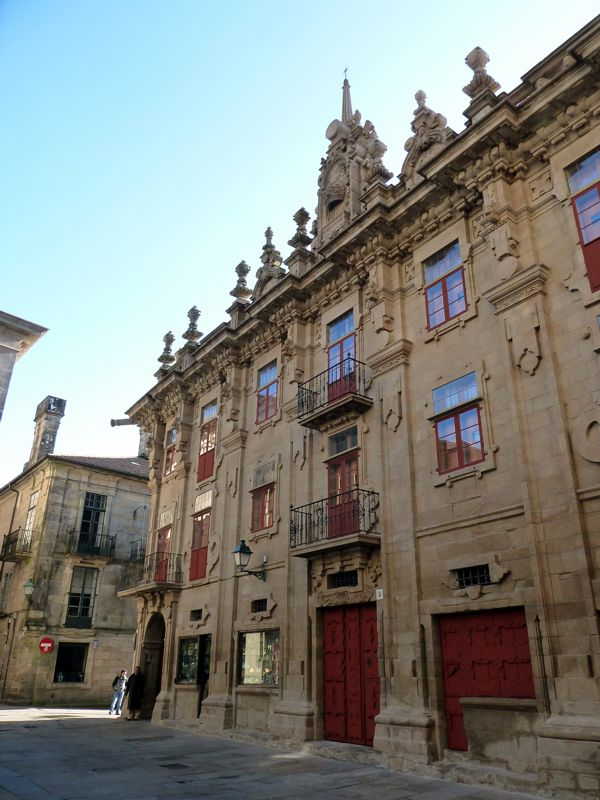

Casa do Cabido is a historic house in Santiago de Compostela, Province of A Coruña, Galicia, Spain, facing the Praza de Praterías. It was designed for urban beautification in order to decorate and match the surroundings and completed in 1758 in the baroque style.

== History and characteristics ==
The medieval silversmith guilds gave name to the Praza das Praterías and to the south façade of the cathedral: across the square, the Baroque-style Casa do Cabido was built, about three meters deep with an only scenographic function, closing one of the sides around the fountain. Designed by the architect of the Galician baroque Clemente Fernández Sarela, it dates from the year 1758. Initially it was the seat of the Cathedral Council, but it became private property in the mid-nineteenth century.

This way Casa do Cabido, in front of the cathedral, had a new fake façade strictly following the local architectural order of the early 18th century, the style of plates typical of the Baroque in Compostela.

It inspired Valle-Inclán the story of My Sister Antonia, just like the fountain (Fonte dos Cabalos) inspired Federico García Lorca for the Dance of the Moon poem in Santiago. In the year 2005, the film The Carpenter's Pencil was shot on it.
