= Lois Pereiro =

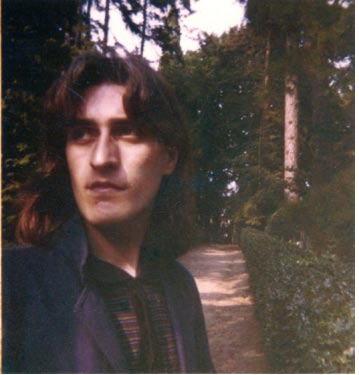
- Born: Luis Ángel Sánchez Pereiro; February 16, 1958; Monforte de Lemos, Spain
- Died: May 24, 1996 (aged 38); A Coruña, Spain
- Resting place: Santa Cristina do Viso (O Incio)
- Occupations: Writer, poet
- Writing career
- Language: Galician
- Website: loispereiro.blogaliza.org

Luis Ángel Sánchez Pereiro alias Lois Pereiro (born Monforte de Lemos, February 16, 1958-died La Coruña, May 24, 1996) was a Spanish poet and writer.

Galician Literature Day was dedicated to him in 2011.

== Biography ==
He was born in Monforte de Lemos, into a family from O Incio. He studied in the school of the Escolapios, and began to write at 15 years of age. After finalising the COU (pre-university course) he left for Madrid, where he started his university studies of Political Sciences and Sociology. After a stay in Monforte working in the family company, devoted to the glass industry, he returned to Madrid to study English, French and German. There he founded the magazine Loia with Antón Patiño Pérez, Manuel Rivas and his brother Xosé Manuel Pereiro.

In 1981 he went to live in A Coruña, where he joined the magazine La Naval. At that time he came into contact with a group of poets: Xavier Seoane, Francisco Salinas Portugal and Xulio López Valcárcel, participating in several anthologies such as De amor e desamor (1984) and De amor e desamor II (1985), and collaborating in magazines like La Naval, Trilateral, Anima+l and Luzes of Galiza. He published in 1997, in the magazine Luzes of Galiza, the eight chapters of the short novel Náufragos do Paradiso.

Between 1983 and 1987 he travelled with Fernando Saco in Europe. He worked translating German, French and English for cinema dubbing and, especially, in television, dubbing as much conventional series (episodes of Dallas and Kung fu) as pornographic film.

He only published two collections of poems in his life, Poemas 1981/1991 (1992) and Poesía última de amor e enfermidade (1995). In 1996, the year of his death, Poemas para unha Loia, came to light which collected together works of his Madrid period, published in the magazine Loia, and included the essay Modesta proposición para renunciar a facer xirar a roda hidráulica dunha cíclica historia universal da infamia, published in the 27th volume of Luzes de Galiza.

With regard to the cause of the death of Pereiro, in spite of suffering AIDS, it was an accumulation of illnesses that finished with liver failure. Officially and in accordance with a sentence of the Provincial Audience of Lugo, after a lawsuit so that the State paid the burial, the reason of his death was intoxication by denatured rapeseed oil.

== Recognition ==
Over the years he demanded that Galician Literature Day be dedicated to him. To this end a new edition of his poetic work was released translated to the Spanish, Catalan and Basque, together with the original texts in Galician.

Finally, on June 26, 2010 the Royal Galician Academy published its decision to devote Galician Literature Day 2011 to him. The Academy appreciated:

The evident expressionist traces, references to Germanic literature and certain strokes of counterculture [...] an image and an aesthetic that made him a cult author. Like no-one else he found his way through the contemporary world, combining a sceptical individualism with a devastating tradition of Central European Expressionism.

In words of the writer and member of the Royal Galician Academy Manuel Rivas:

To devote Galician Literature Day 2011 to Lois was a brave decision by the Academy because he is a cult author, but as soon as his work becomes widespread he will become a very popular author.

== Example of his lyric ==
A verse from one of his poems, carved as an epitaph on his gravestone at Santa Cristina do Viso (O Incio), gives a sample of the rawness and nakedness of his poetry: Cuspídeme enriba cando pasedes por diante do lugar onde eu repouse, enviándome unha húmida mensaxe de vida e de furia necesaria ("Spit on me when you go past of the place where I rest, sending me a humid message of life and of necessary fury.")

== Works ==
=== Poetry ===
- Poemas 1981/1991 (1992)
- Poesía última de amor e enfermidade (1995)
- Poemas para unha Loia (1997)
- Antoloxía (2011)
- Obra poética completa (2011)
- Obra completa (bilingual edition) (2011)
- Poesía última de amor y enfermedad (2012, Libros del Silencio) (trad Spanish by Daniel Salgado)
- Collected Poems (Complete poetry in English. Trad by Jonathan Dunne) (2011, Small Station Press)
- Sabrani stihotvoreniya (complete poetry in Bulgarian. Trad. by Tsvetanka Elenkova) (2013, Small Station Press)
- Akaberako poesía amodioaz eta gaitzaz (1992-1995) (Poesía última de amor e enfermidade in Basque version. Trad. de Joxemari Sestorain) (Denonartean-Cenlit, 2013)
- Poesía última d'amor i malaltia (19912-1995) (Catalan version de F. Escandell) (2016)

=== Narrative ===
- Conversa ultramarina (2010)
- Náufragos do Paraíso (2011)

=== Essay ===
- Modesta proposición e outros ensaios (2011)
