= Library of Galicia =

Library in Galicia, Spain

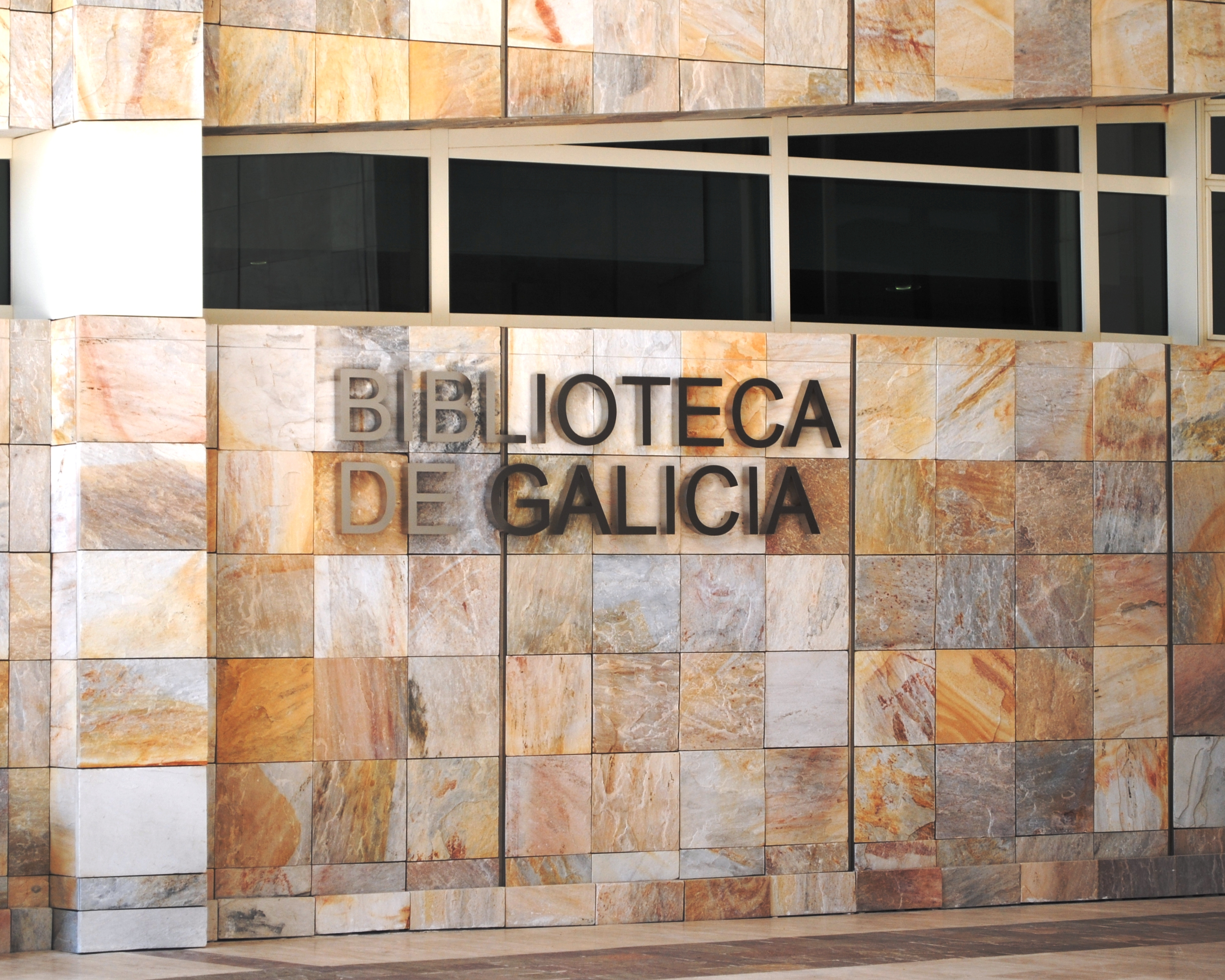
- 42.8698°N 8.5262°W
- Type: Public library
- Established: January 11, 2011

Other information
- Website: bibliotecadegalicia.xunta.es

The Library of Galicia (Galician: Biblioteca de Galicia), is a Spain-based public library located in the Galician Cultural City of Santiago de Compostela, the capital of the Galicia Autonomous Region, Spain. It is the largest public library in the Galicia Autonomous Region. The library was designed by American architect Peter Eisenman.

Library of Galicia disseminates the legacy of intellectuals and artists such as Isaac Díaz Pardo, Luis Seoane and Basilio Losada. The library is the flagship of the Galician library system.

== History ==
Library of Galicia was opened on January 11, 2011, covering an area of 155,205 square feet. In March 2013, it had approximately 800,000 volumes in storage.
