= The Carpenter's Pencil (film) =

2003 film by Antón Reixa

- Theatrical release poster
- Spanish: El lápiz del carpintero
- Directed by: Antón Reixa
- Screenplay by: Xosé Morais; Antón Reixa
- Based on: The Carpenter's Pencil by Manuel Rivas
- Produced by: María Angulo; Juan Gordon; David Martínez; Antón Reixa; Pedro Uriol
- Starring: Tristán Ulloa; Luis Tosar; María Adánez
- Cinematography: Andreu Rebés
- Edited by: Guillermo Represa
- Music by: Lucio Godoy
- Production companies: Morena Films; Portozás Visión S.L.; Sogecine; TeleMadrid; Televisión de Galicia (TVG) S.A.
- Distributed by: CDI Films; Transeuropa Video Entertainment
- Release date: 25 April 2003 (Spain)
- Running time: 106 min

The Carpenter's Pencil (Spanish: El lápiz del carpintero) is a 2003 Spanish war drama film directed by Antón Reixa, scored by Antón Seoane and starring Tristán Ulloa, Luis Tosar and María Adánez. It is set in the Spanish Civil War in Galicia, Spain, and is based on the novel of the same name by Manuel Rivas; the director read the novel at least seventy eight times.

The film got 171,325 spectators and was described as well-meaning and Manichean. Luis Tosar said that his part in this film was the most difficult role he has portrayed.

Part of the story is based on the life of the cartoonist Camilo Díaz Baliño.

== Cast ==
- Tristán Ulloa as Daniel Da Barca
- Luis Tosar as Herbal
- María Adánez as Marisa Mallo
- Nancho Novo as Zalo
- María Pujalte as Beatriz
- Manuel Manquiña as Benito Mallo
- Anne Igartiburu as Madre Izarne
- Maxo Barjas as Laura
- Carlos Sobera as Landesa
- Sergio Pazos as Sargento Somoza
- Monti Castiñeiras as Alejandro
- Miguel de Lira as Pepe Sánchez
- Gonzalo Uriarte as Doctor Soláns
- Celso Parada as Gengis Kahn
- Santi Prego as Dombodán
- Carlos Blanco as Pintor
- Eloy Silva as Herbal niño
- Manuel Lourenzo as Director cárcel
- Celso Bugallo as Padre Herbal
- Yoima Valdés as María
- Sofía Mareque as Marisa niña
- Antonio Mourelos as Casal
- Luis C. Zahera as Acuña
- Ana Asensio as Margarita
- Manuel Millán as Loco
- Julio Lago as Inspector
- Xosé Manuel Esperante as Baldomir
- Xúlio Abonjo as Botones
- Nacho Castaño as Manuel
- Mónica García as Mujer del pintor
- Antonio Lagares as Cura de Fronteira
- Marcos Orsi as Michel
- Cándido Pazó as Cura arzobispado
- Josito Porto as Pablo
- Rodrigo Roel as Presidente tribunal
- Antonio F. Simón as El cura
- Tatán as Antonio
- Tuto Vázquez as Tío Nan

== See also ==
- List of Spanish films of 2003
