= Façade =

Exterior part of a building, usually the front but not always

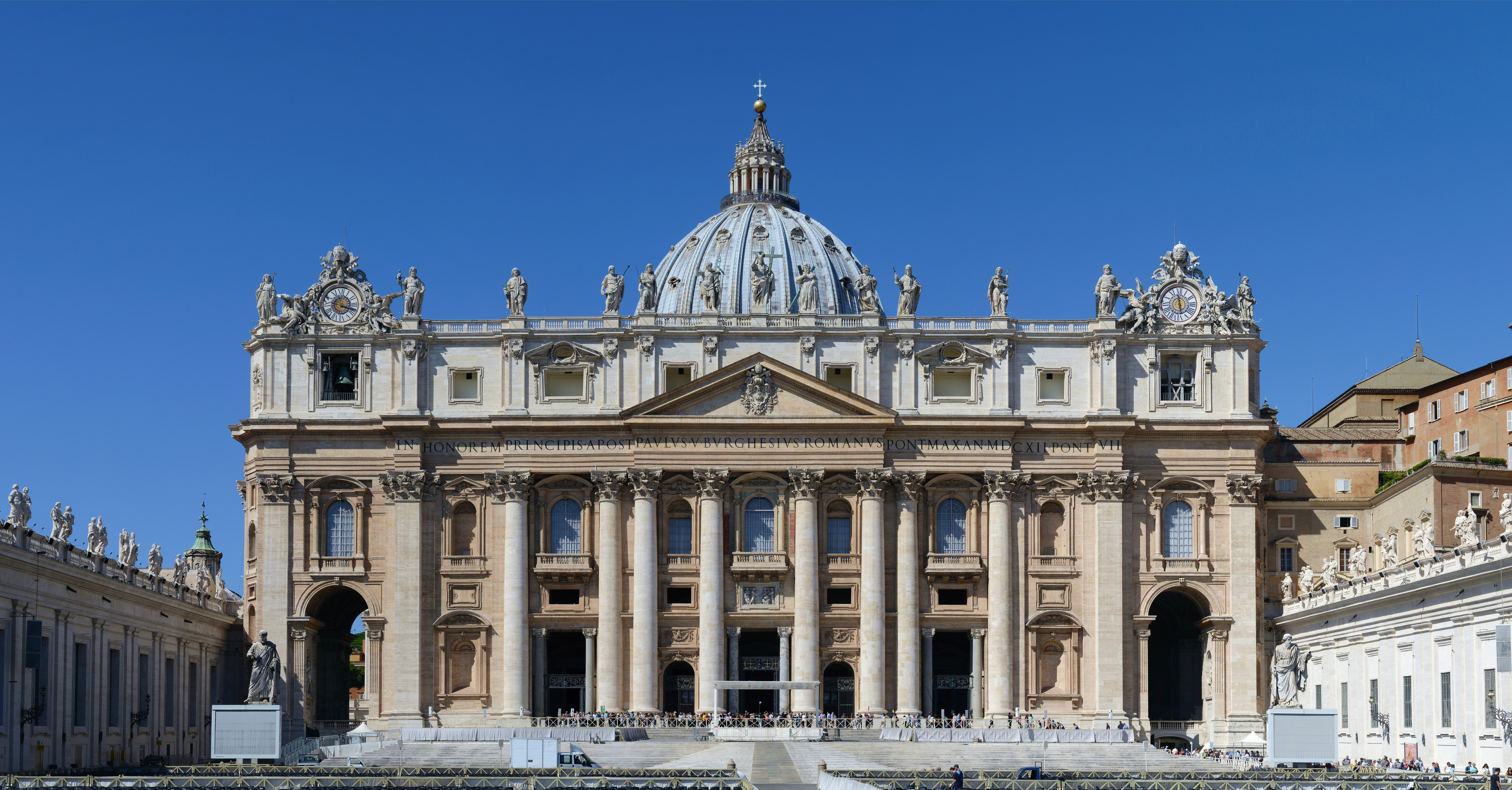
Carlo Maderno's monumental façade of St. Peter's Basilica in Vatican City

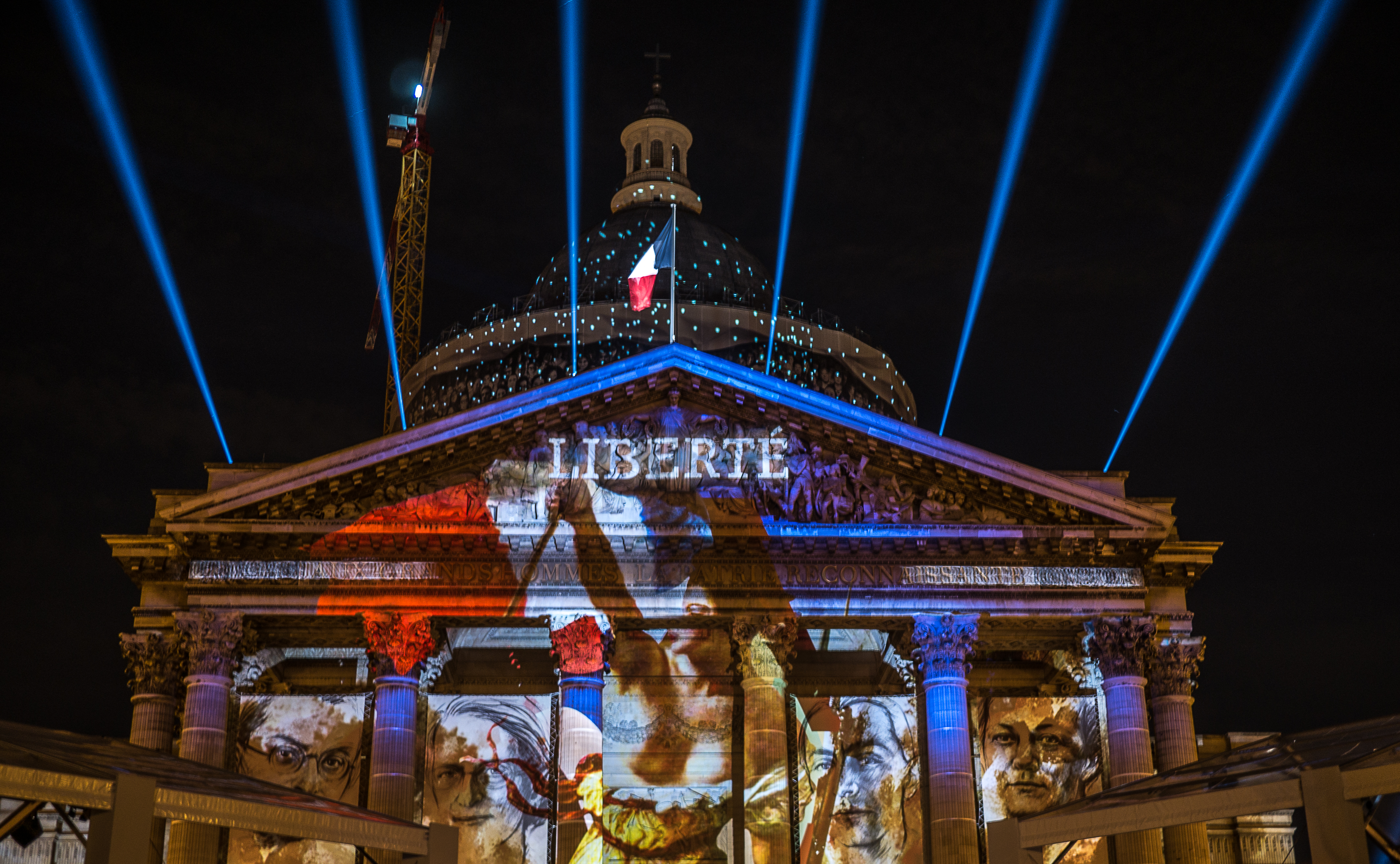
The façade of the Panthéon in Paris illuminated at night on 27 May 2015 for the admittance of Germaine Tillion, Geneviève de Gaulle-Anthonioz, Pierre Brossolette and Jean Zay to the mausoleum

A façade or facade (/fəˈsɑːd/) is the front part or exterior of a building. It is a loanword from the French façade (pronounced [fasad]), which means "frontage" or "face".

In architecture, the façade of a building is often the most important aspect from a design standpoint, as it sets the tone for the rest of the building. From the engineering perspective, the façade is also of great importance due to its impact on energy efficiency. For historical façades, many local zoning regulations or other laws greatly restrict or even forbid their alteration.

Outside of architecture, "façade" is used to describe a deceptive outward appearance.

== Etymology ==
The word is a loanword from the French façade, which in turn comes from the Italian facciata, from faccia meaning 'face', ultimately from post-classical Latin facia. The earliest usage recorded by the Oxford English Dictionary is 1656.

== Façades added to earlier buildings ==
It was quite common in the Georgian period for existing houses in English towns to be given a fashionable new façade. For example, in the city of Bath, The Bunch of Grapes in Westgate Street appears to be a Georgian building, but the appearance is only skin deep and some of the interior rooms still have Jacobean plasterwork ceilings.

This new construction has happened also in other places: in Santiago de Compostela the three-metre-deep Casa do Cabido was built to match the architectural order of the square, and the main Churrigueresque façade of the Santiago de Compostela Cathedral, facing the Plaza del Obradoiro, is actually encasing and concealing the older Portico of Glory.

== High rise façades ==
In modern high-rise buildings, the exterior walls are often suspended from the concrete floor slabs. Examples include curtain walls and precast concrete walls. The façade can at times be required to have a fire-resistance rating, for instance, if two buildings are very close together, to lower the likelihood of fire spreading from one building to another.

In general, the façade systems that are suspended or attached to the precast concrete slabs will be made from aluminum (powder coated or anodized) or stainless steel. In recent years more lavish materials such as titanium have sometimes been used, but due to their cost and susceptibility to panel edge staining these have not been popular.

Whether rated or not, fire protection is always a design consideration. The melting point of aluminum, 660 °C (1,220 °F), is typically reached within minutes of the start of a fire. Fire stops for such building joints can be qualified, too. Putting fire sprinkler systems on each floor has a profoundly positive effect on the fire safety of buildings with curtain walls.

The extended use of new materials, like polymers, resulted in an increase of high-rise building façade fires over the past few years, since they are more flammable than traditional materials.

Some building codes also limit the percentage of window area in exterior walls. When the exterior wall is not rated, the perimeter slab edge becomes a junction where rated slabs are abutting an unrated wall. For rated walls, one may also choose rated windows and fire doors, to maintain that wall's rating.

== Film sets and theme parks ==
On a film set and within most themed attractions, many of the buildings are only façade, which are far cheaper than actual buildings, and not subject to building codes (within film sets). In film sets, they are simply held up with supports from behind, and sometimes have boxes for actors to step in and out of from the front if necessary for a scene. Within theme parks, they are usually decoration for the interior ride or attraction, which is based on a simple building design.

== Examples ==
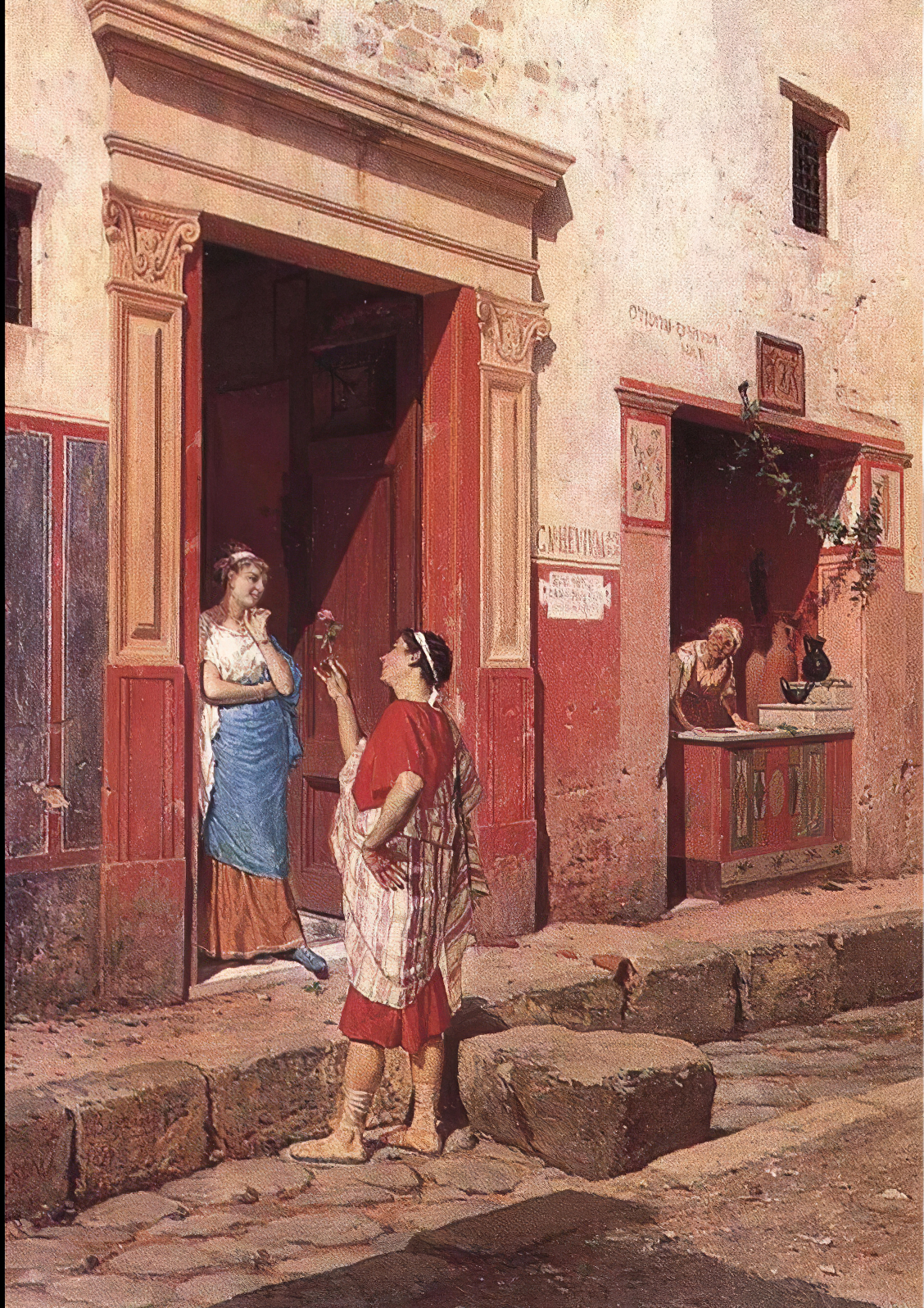
Façade of a 1st-century CE Roman domus in Pompeii, Italy

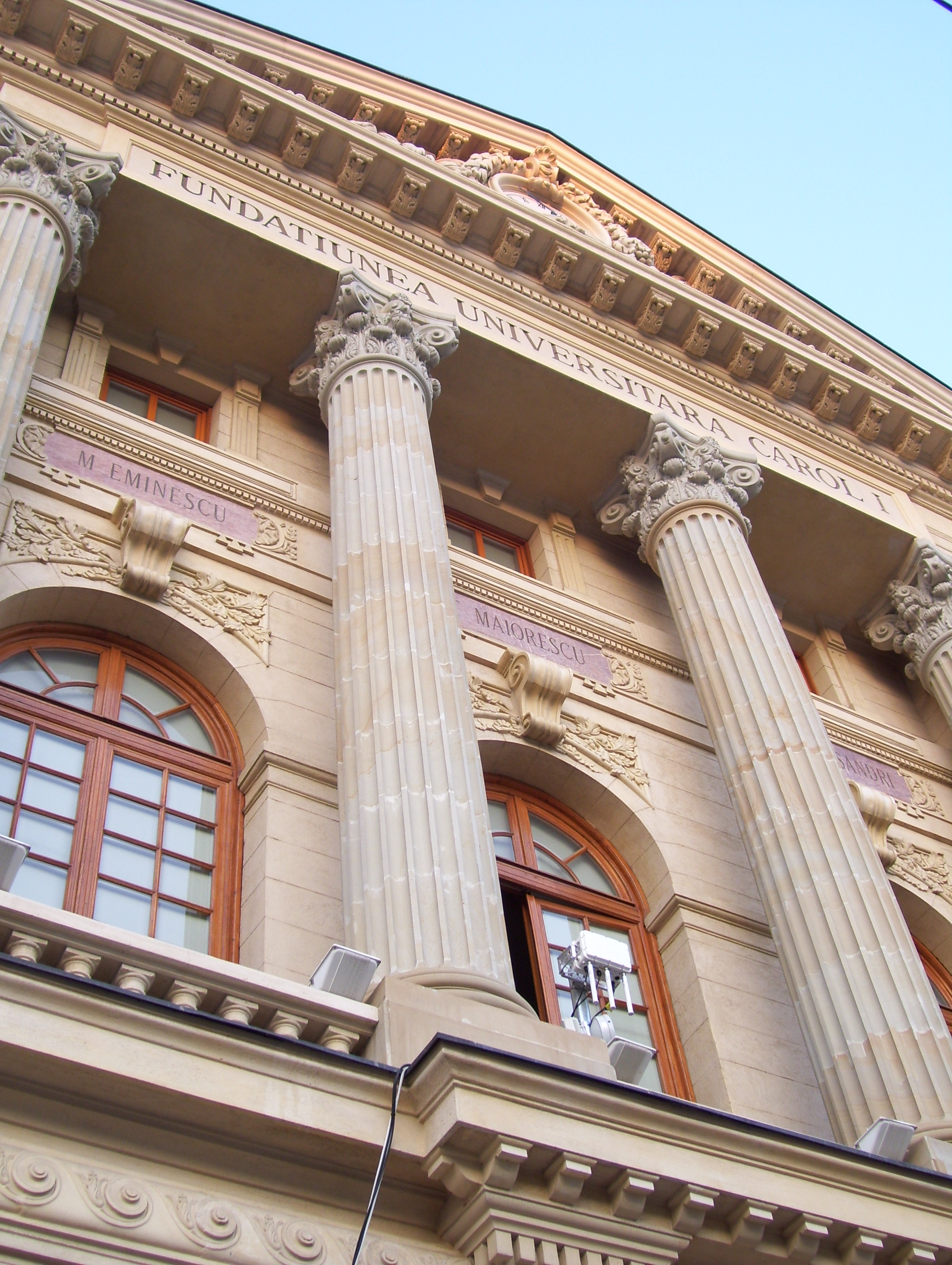
Part of the Central University Library of Bucharest (Romania)

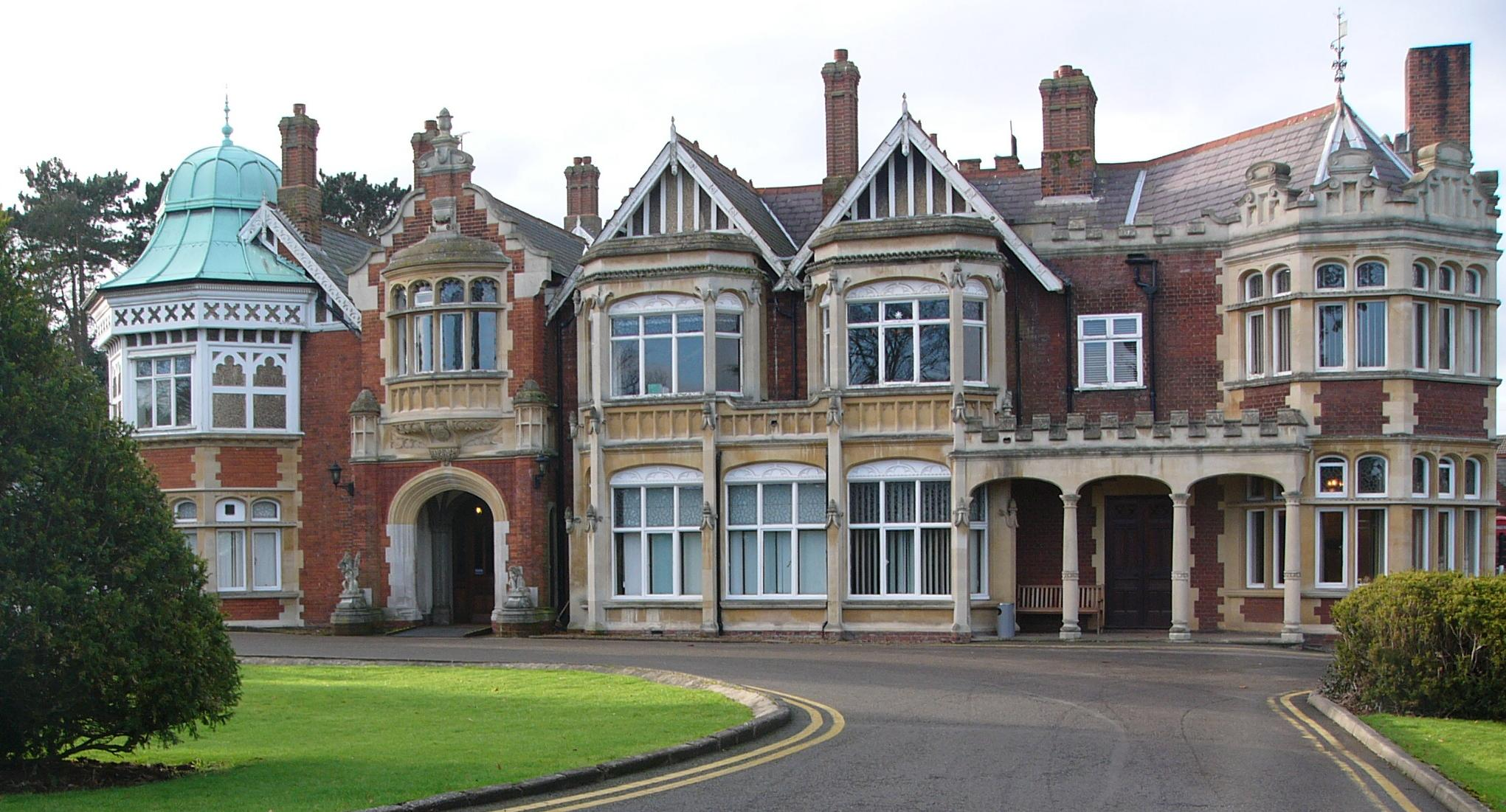
The façade at Bletchley Park (UK) is a mix of architectural styles.

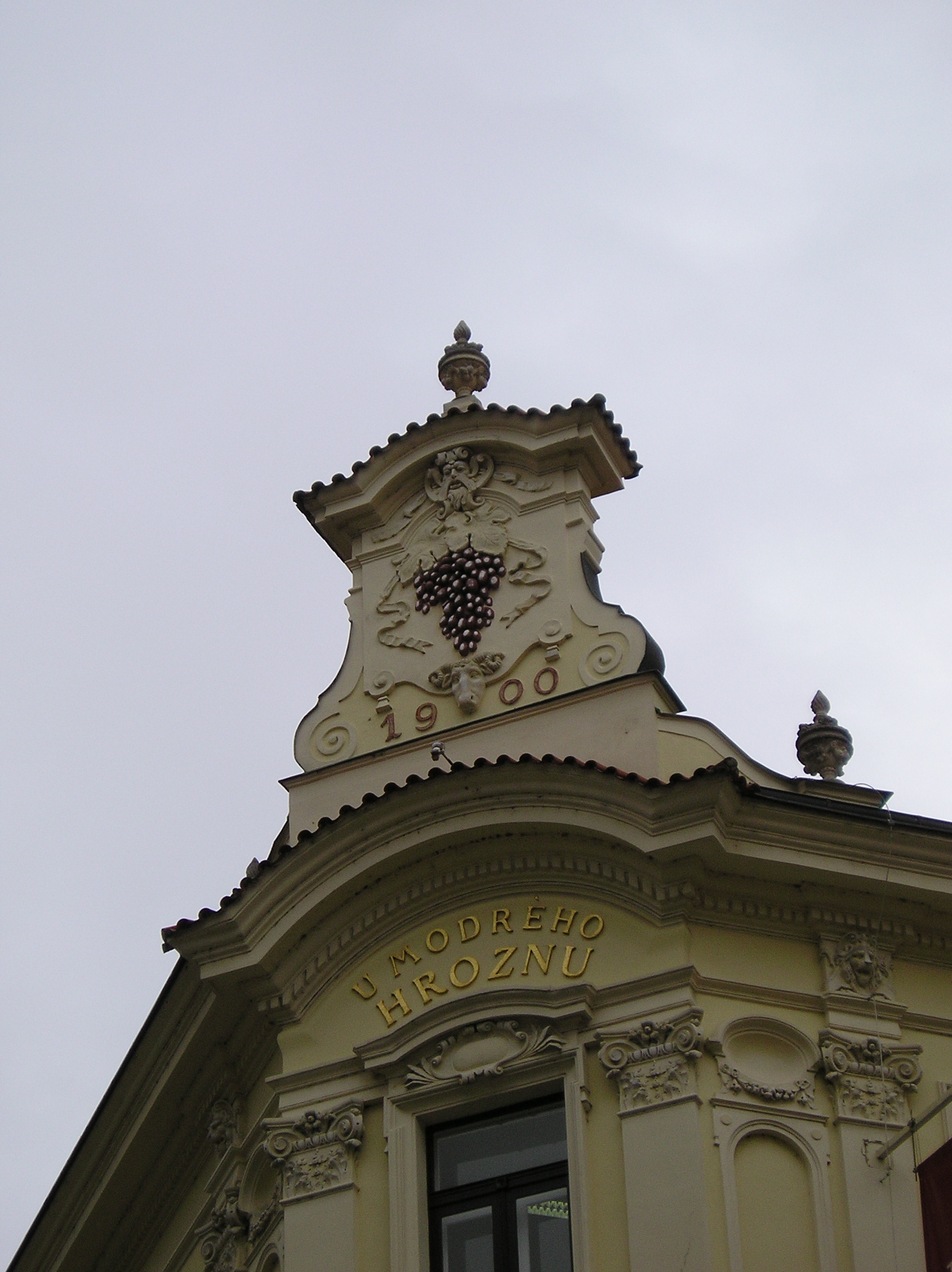
Detail of a façade from Prague (Czech Republic)

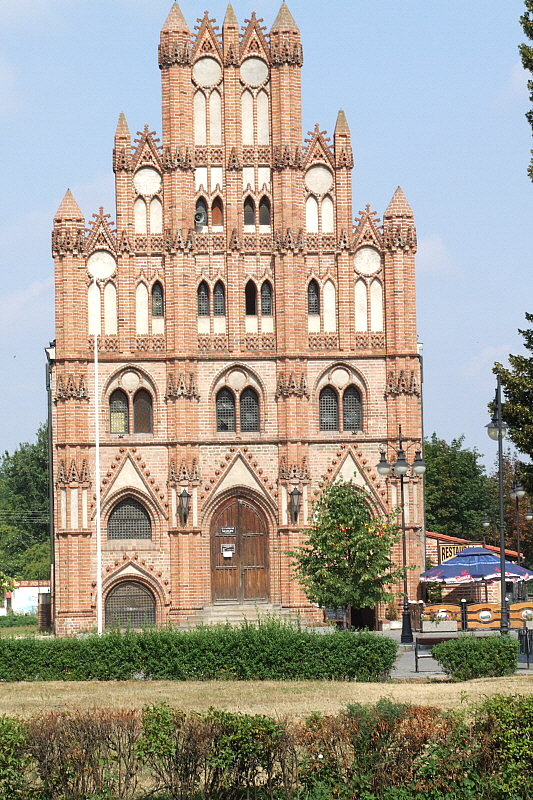
Façade of the town hall in Chojna (Poland)

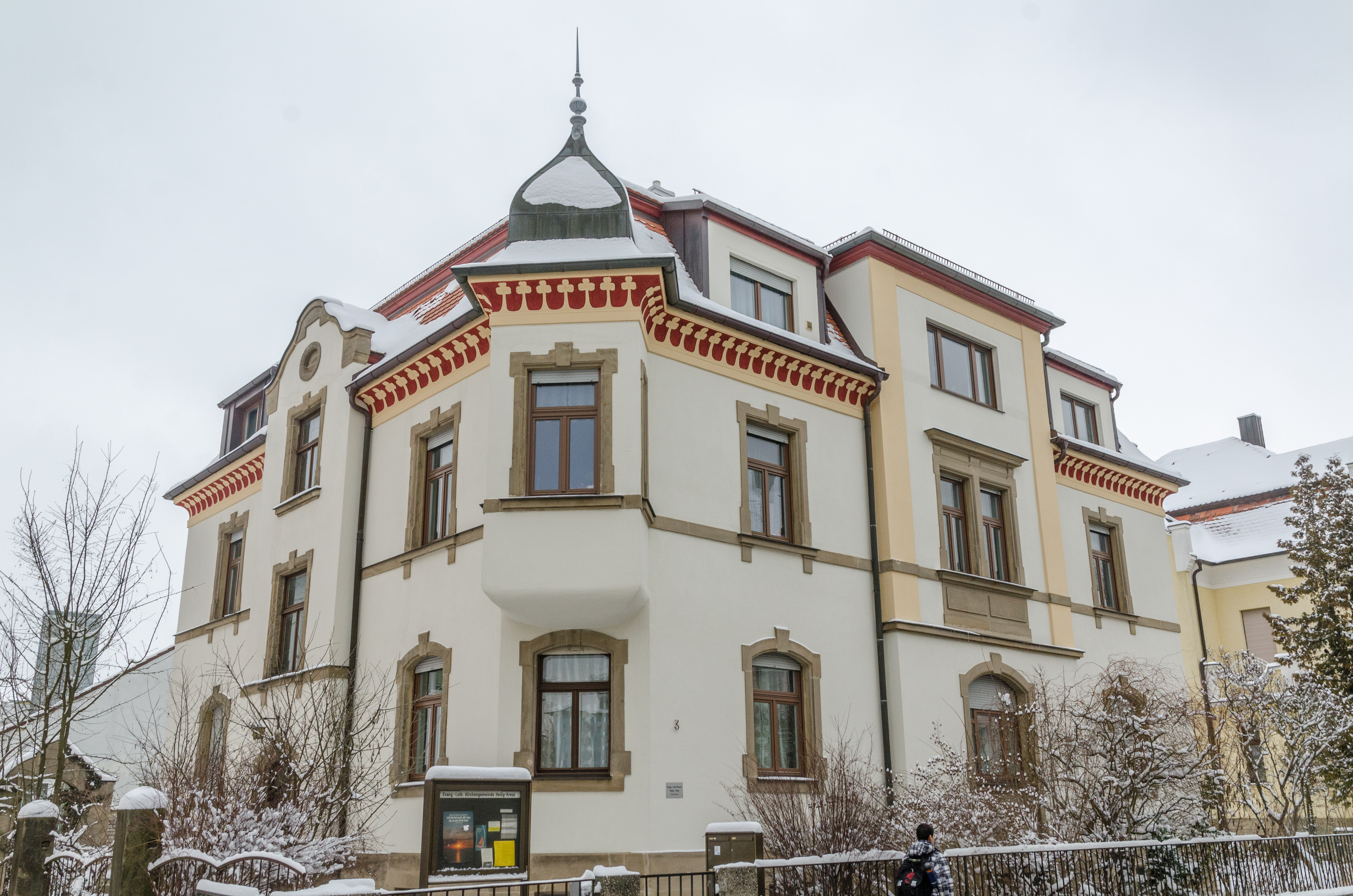
Façade of a house from Ansbach (Germany)

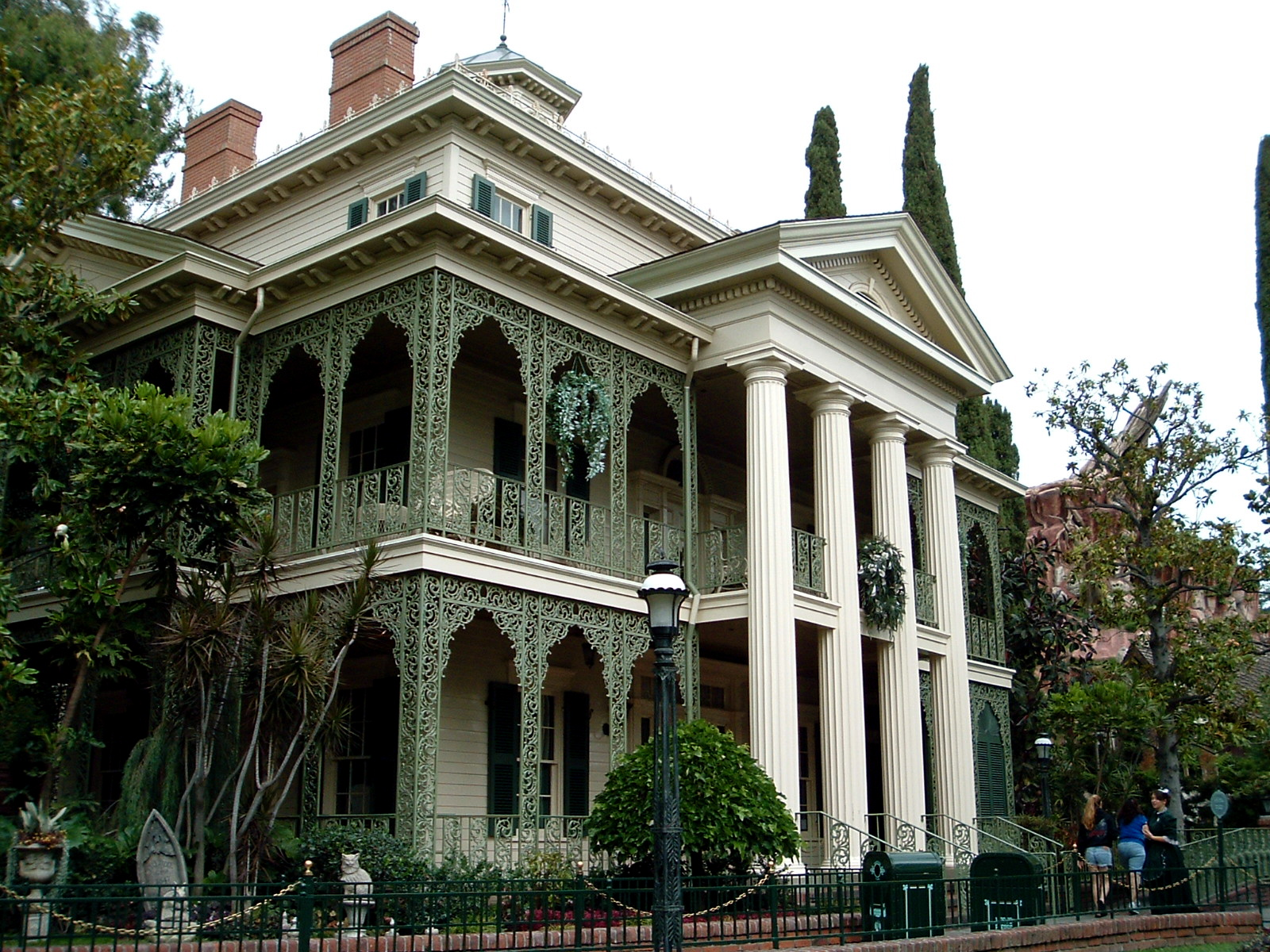
The Haunted Mansion in Disneyland consists of a building and façade in the front, while the majority of the ride is outside the park in a connected building.

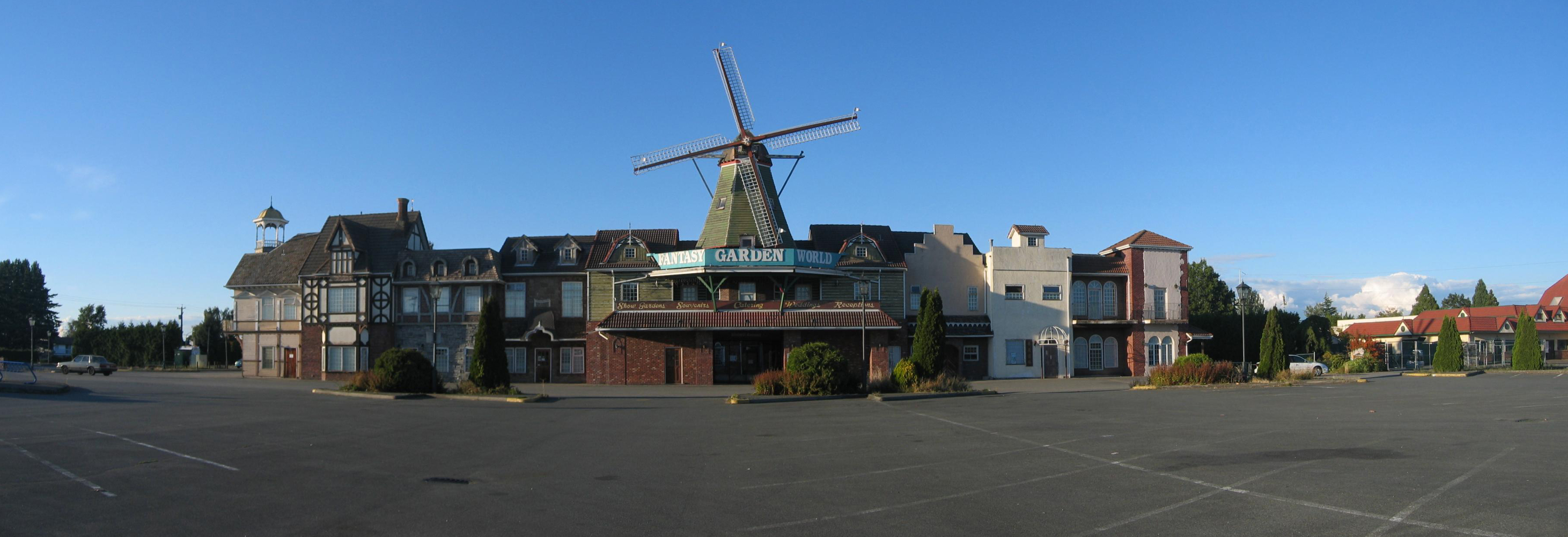
Fantasy Gardens (British Columbia) was a theme park with an exterior designed to resemble many different medieval buildings.

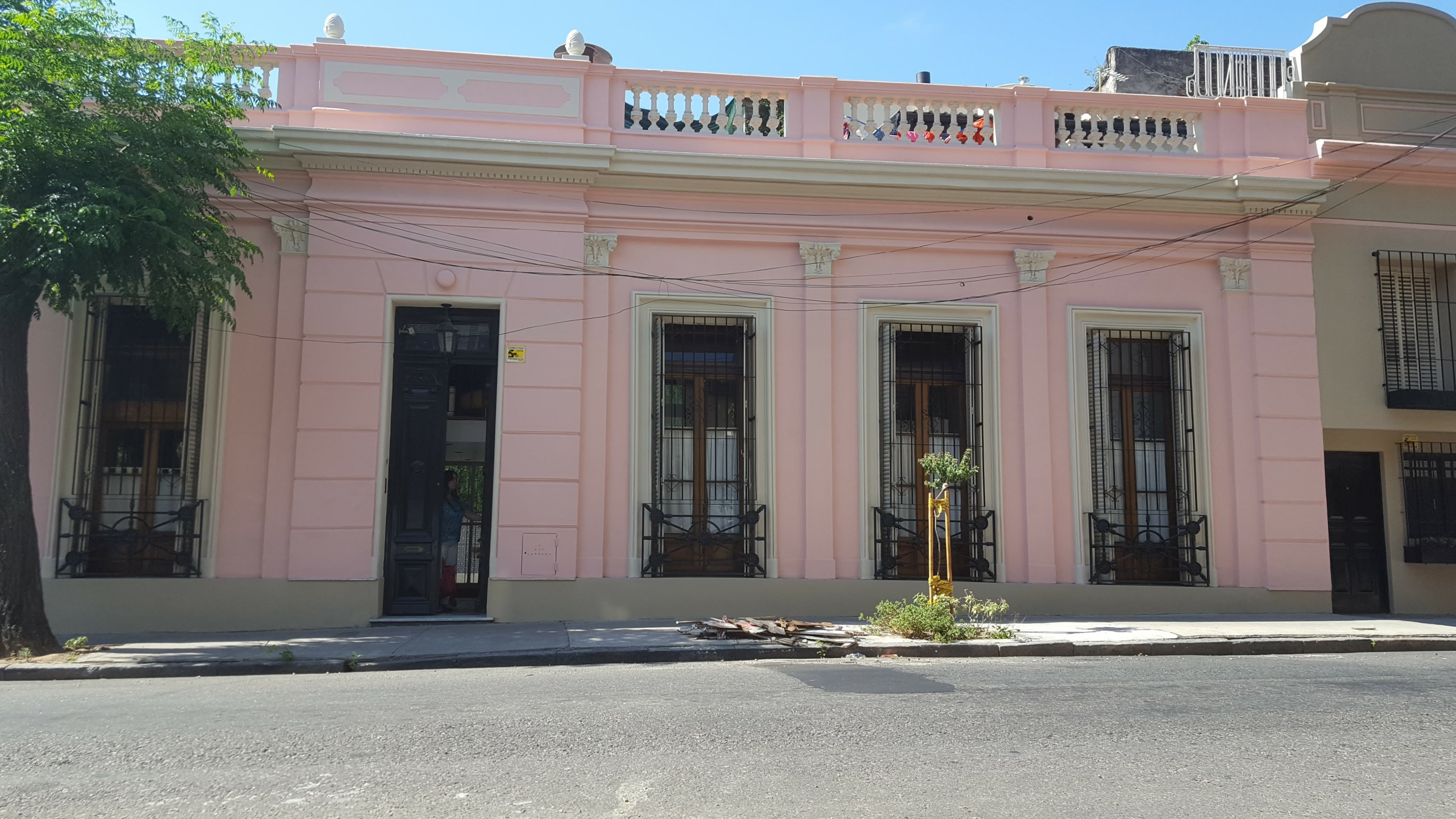
Façade of a typical "Casa Chorizo" house with different ornaments and colors in Buenos Aires (Argentina)

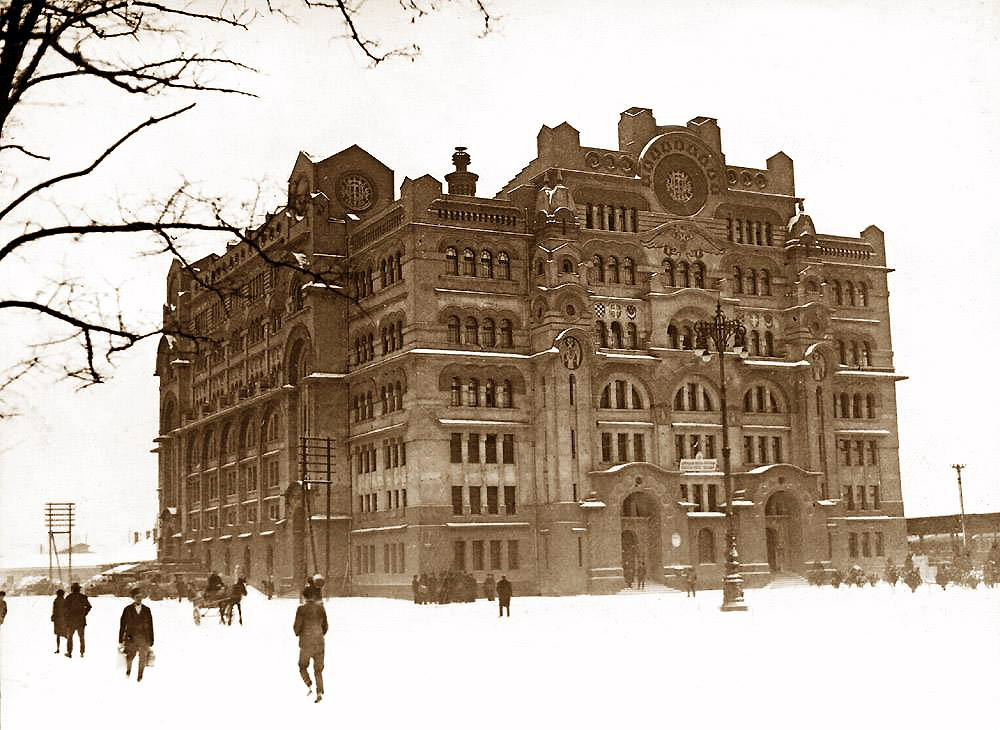
Old Post office in Belgrade, built in Serbo-Byzantine Revival

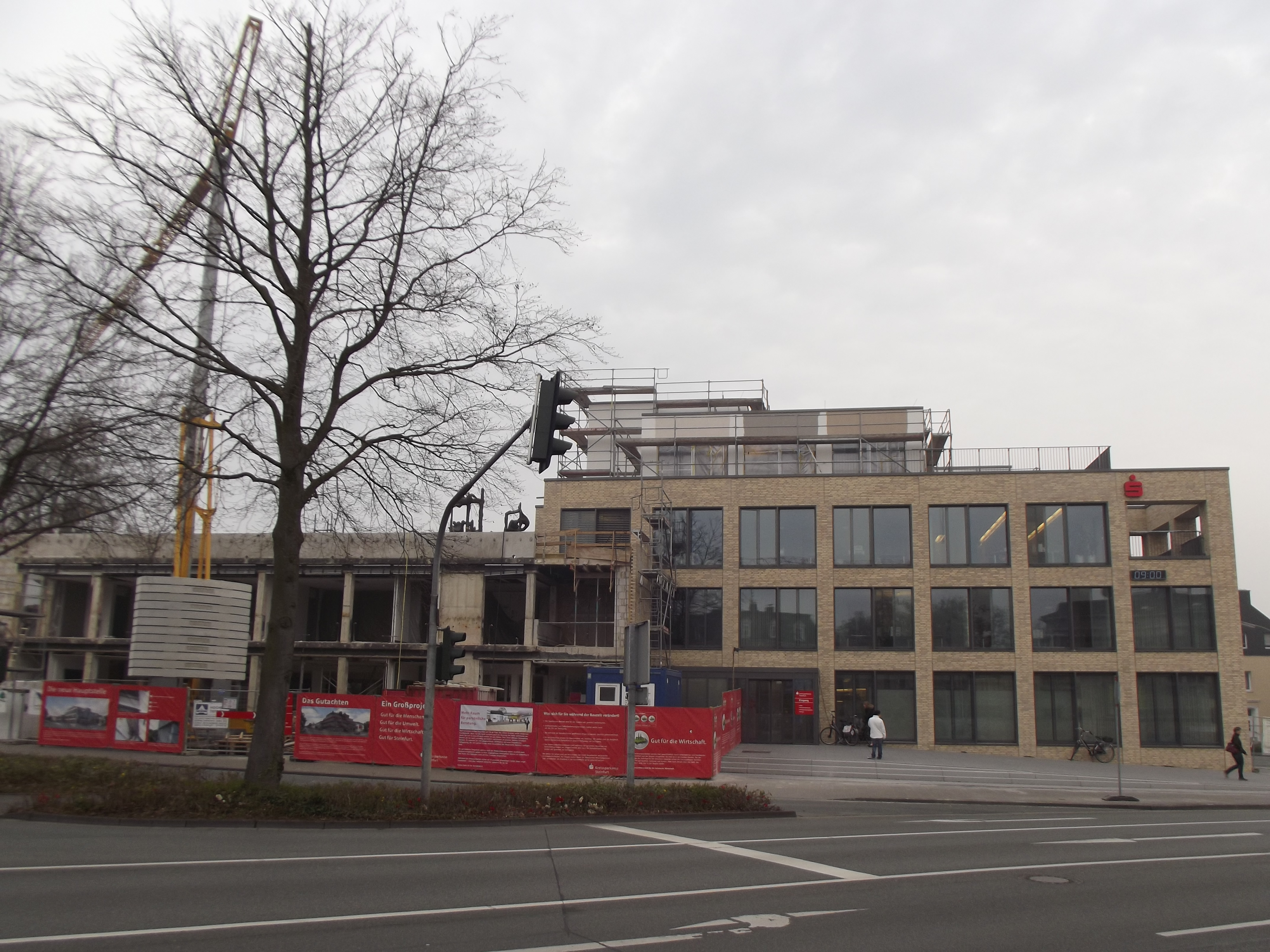
"Energetic rebuilding of a façade" (Germany): The outer walls are torn off and replaced at one wing of the building at a time while the other wing part is still/again in use.

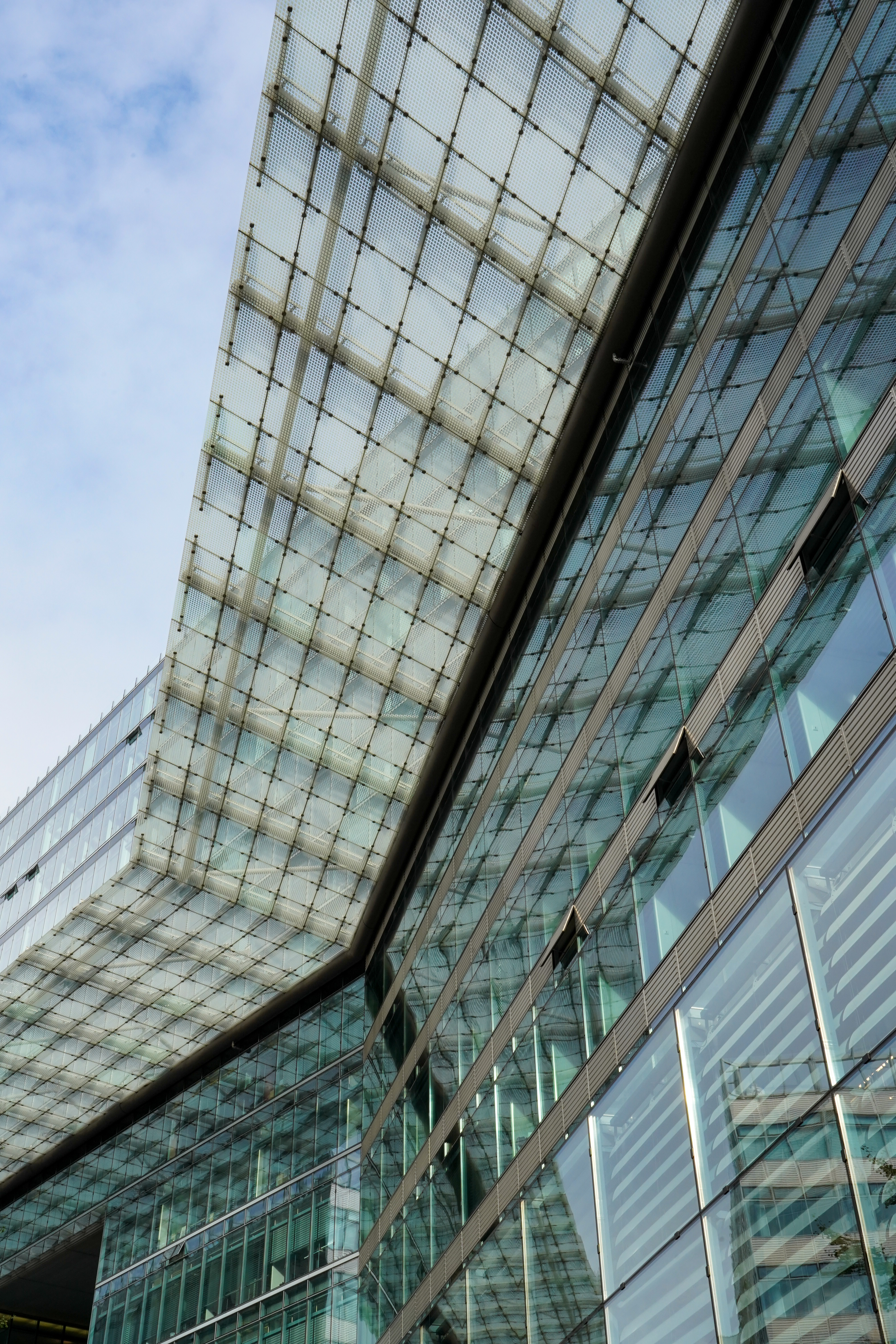
Detail of the glass façade of "Neues Kranzler Eck" by Helmut Jahn, located in Berlin

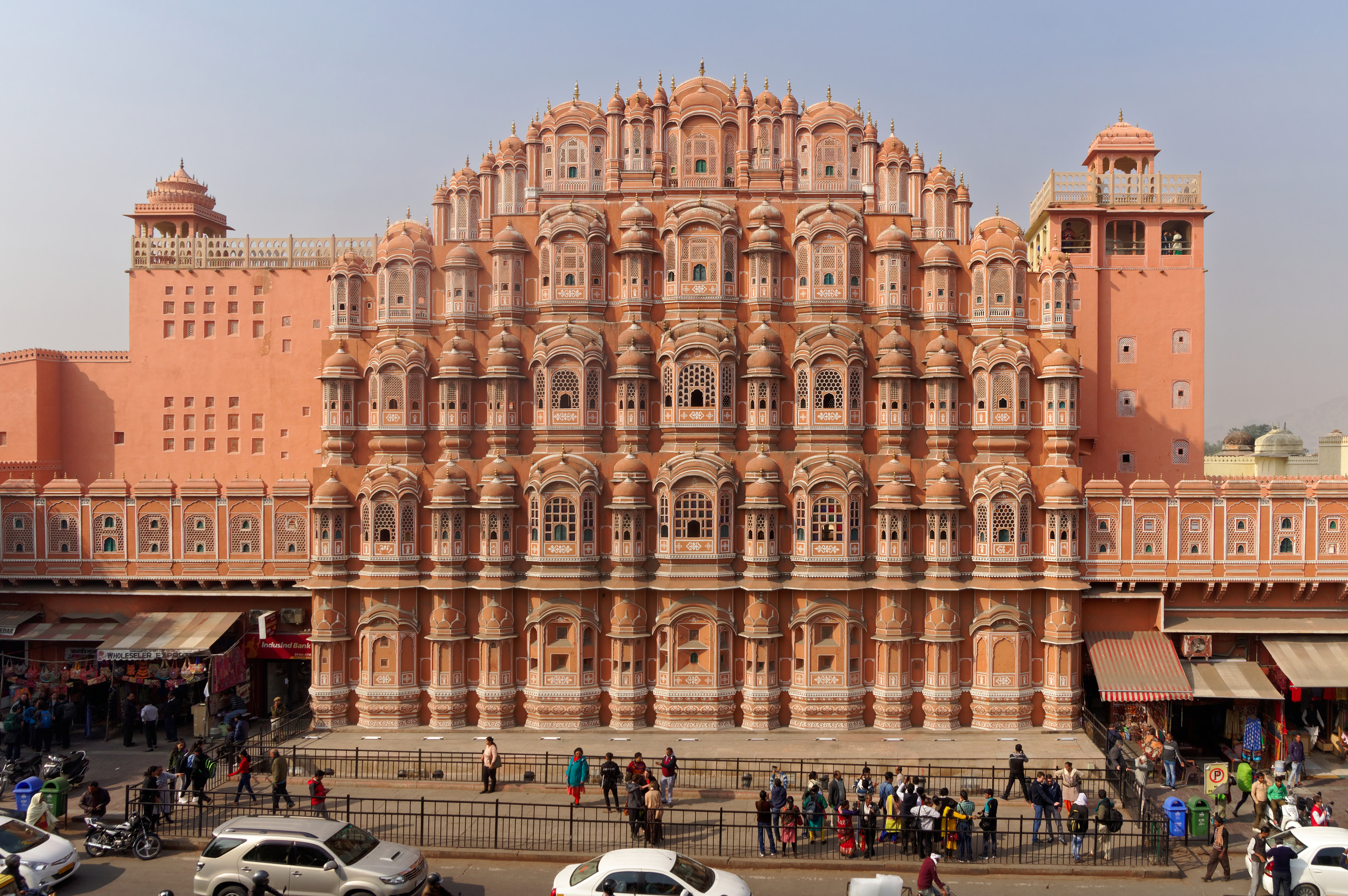
Façade of the Hawa Mahal, Jaipur, Rajasthan, India

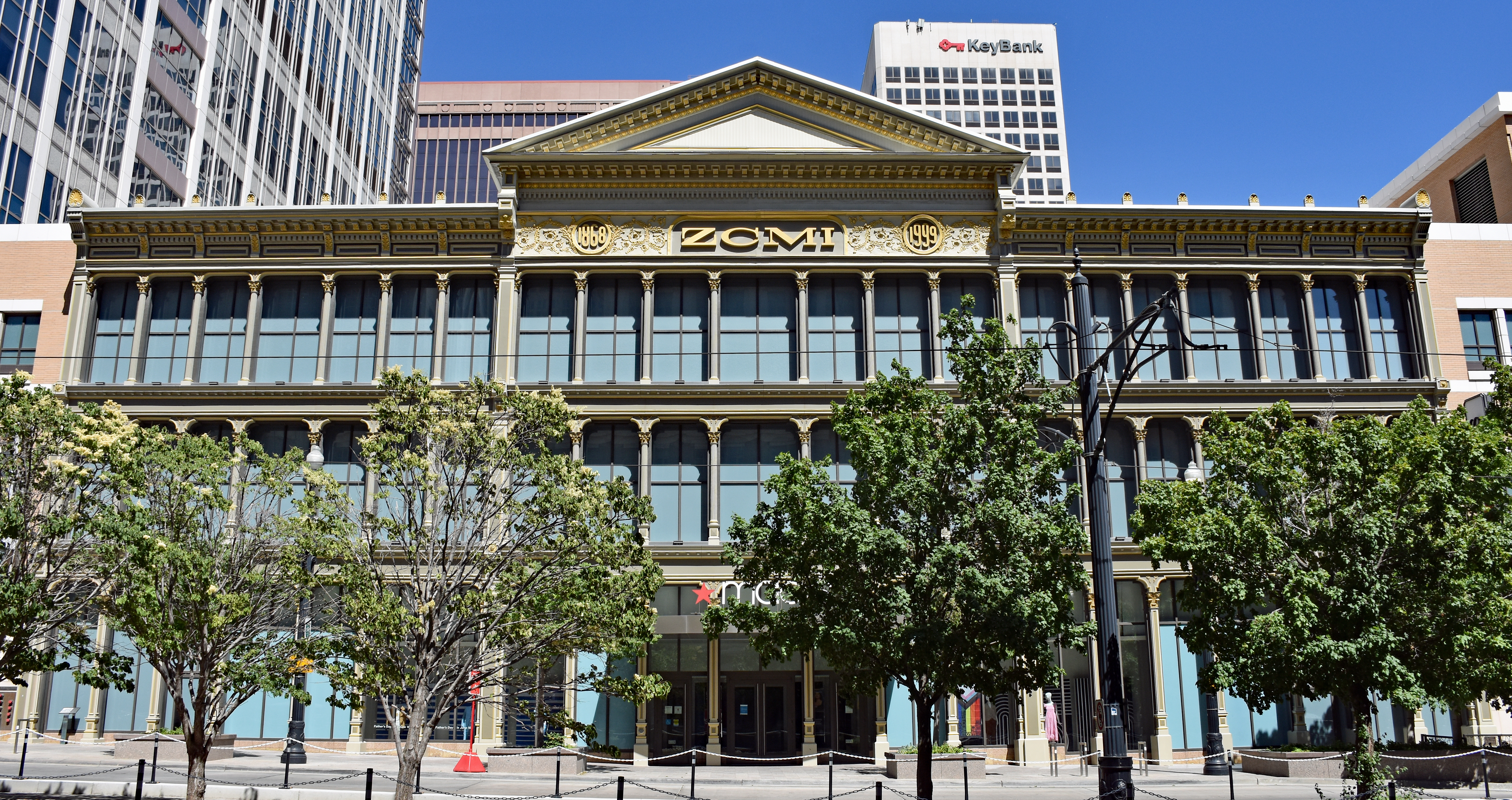
The ZCMI Cast Iron Front in Salt Lake City, Utah, US, has been a façade for several different structures.

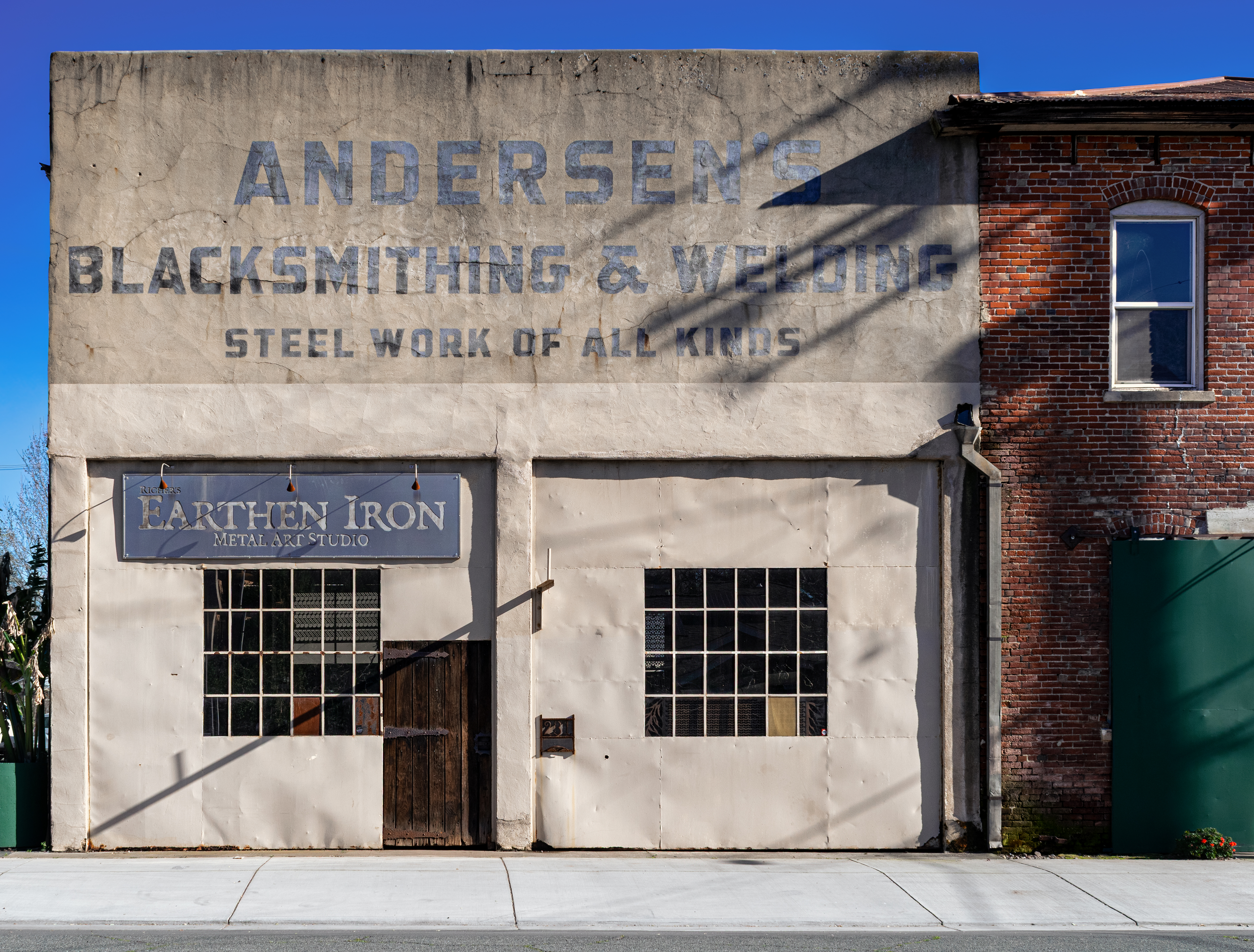
Plastered façade of a functional historic workshop in Chico, California

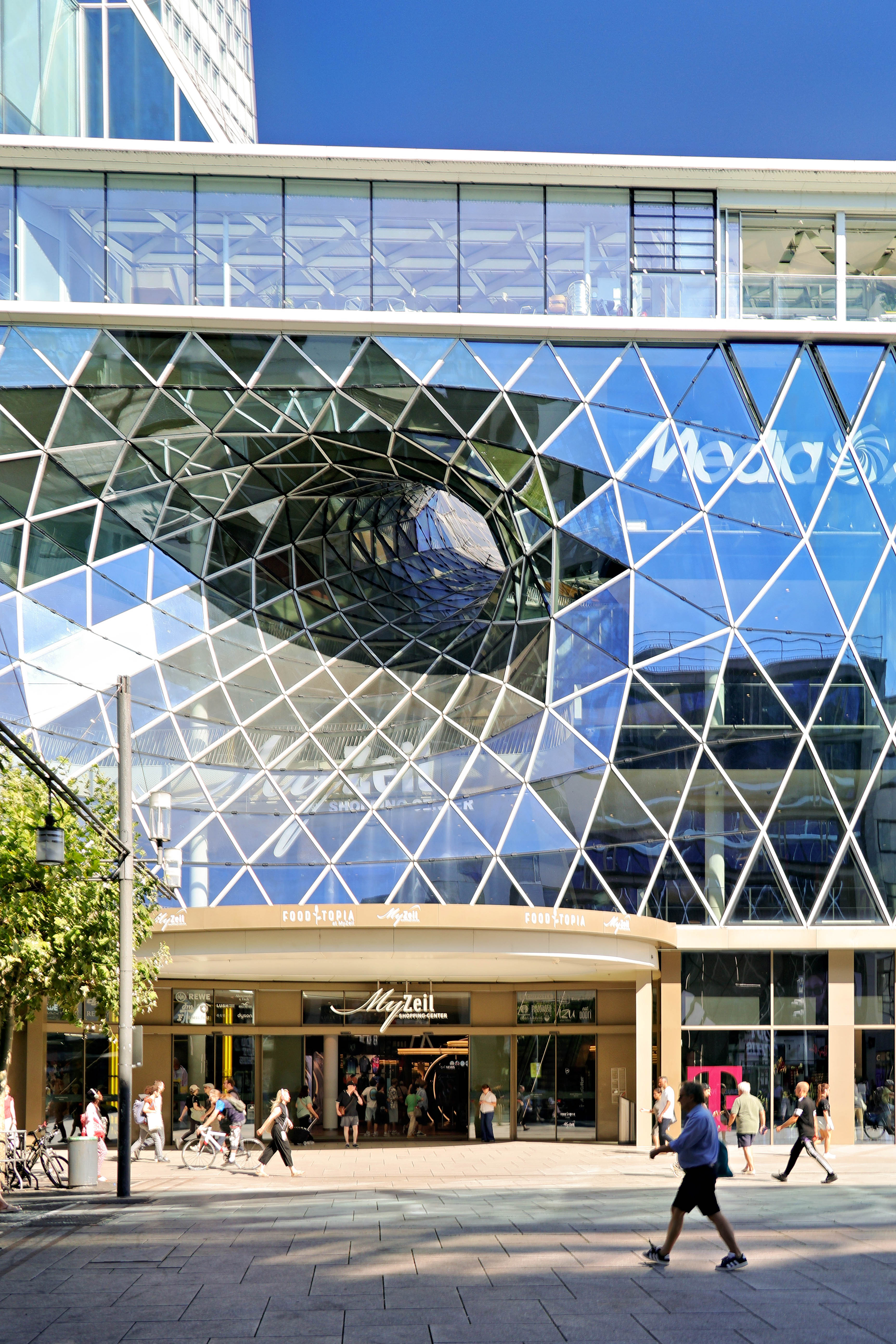
Entrance of MyZeil in Frankfurt

== See also ==
- Curtain wall (architecture)
- Double-skin façade
- Façadism
- Potemkin village
- Cladding (construction)
