= Sargadelos (ceramics) =

Galician ceramics manufacturer founded in 1806

Grupo Sargadelos
- Type: S.L.
- Founded: 1806
- Headquarters: Cervo and Sada, Galicia, Spain,
- Key people: Segismundo García (administrator)
- Products: Ceramics, porcelain, jewellery
- Website: sargadelos.com

Sargadelos (officially the Grupo Sargadelos) is a Galician ceramics and porcelain manufacturer with a history stretching back to 1806. Its products, which are distinguished by their characteristic cobalt blue and white palette, hand-decorated motifs drawn from Galician heritage, and fine hard porcelain, have become one of the most recognizable symbols of Galician cultural identity. The company currently operates two production plants, one in Sargadelos in the municipality of Cervo (Lugo) and one at O Castro de Samoedo in Sada (A Coruña), together employing around 245 people.

Sargadelos carries out significant work in the promotion of Galician culture, in particular supporting emerging talent in the arts and literature. The Sargadelos galleries, located across Galicia and in several other cities, also operate as specialist bookshops focused on Galician and Portuguese literature.

== History ==
=== Foundation and ironworks (1791–1805) ===
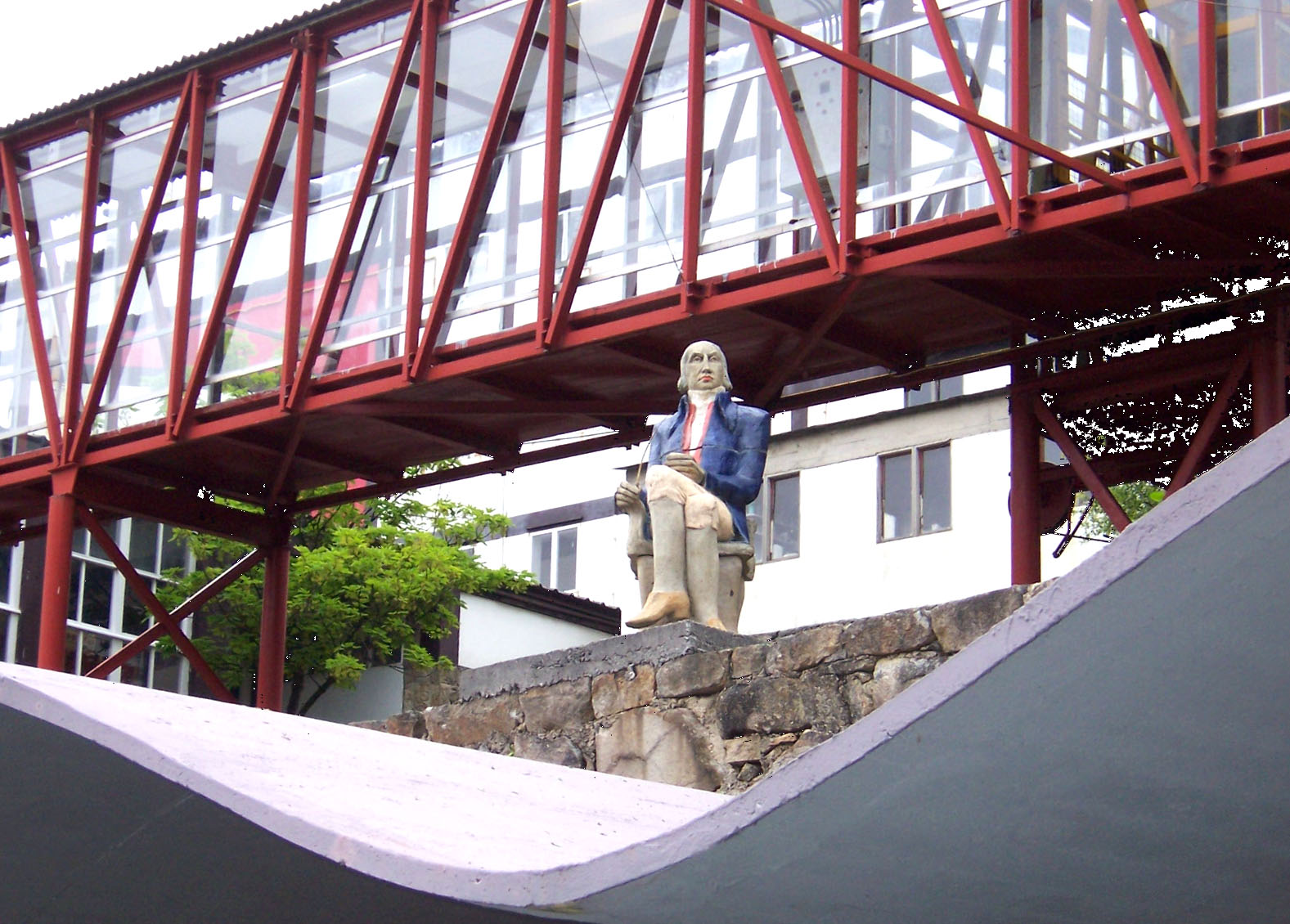
Statue of Antonio Raimundo Ibáñez, founder of the Sargadelos factory, in front of the factory building

The Sargadelos industrial complex was created by Antonio Raimundo Ibáñez (1749–1809), a man of the Enlightenment born in the Asturian parish of Oscos on the border with Galicia, into a poor noble family. Settled in Ribadeo, Ibáñez became involved in maritime trade between Ribadeo and Cádiz and the Baltic, and in 1784, together with businessman José de Andrés García, founded the Real Compañía Marítima to trade in Russian linen, Swedish iron and steel, and Newfoundland cod. In 1791 the two partners founded the ironworks complex at Sargadelos, which, following a government contract in 1794 to produce munitions, supplied cast-iron bars, pipes, chains, hydraulic wheels, kitchen implements, and other goods used across eighteenth-century Spain. The complex also produced sculptural pieces, public fountains and decorative balustrades, some of which survive in Galician towns today.

Thanks to his profits and the protection in Madrid of Manuel Godoy, prime minister to Carlos IV, Ibáñez was able to expand the complex significantly. In 1808, following the success of the ceramics factory, Carlos IV awarded Ibáñez the cross of the Order of Charles III and granted him the titles of Marquis of Sargadelos and Count of Orbaiceta.

=== First ceramics epoch (1806–1832) ===
In 1806, taking advantage of the high-quality kaolin deposits in the area and a gap in the market created by the cessation of imports of English "Bristol" ceramics, Ibáñez opened a pottery factory at Sargadelos — the first of its kind in Galicia. The factory employed a new system of mechanical production, introducing a stamping process imported from Bristol, in which objects were made from fine earthenware; a hard, light material intermediate between common earthenware and porcelain, fired at between 1,100 and 1,200 °C and finished with a lead glaze. The industrial complex consisted of two courtyards, several kilns, offices, stone-breaking machines, and a mill for glazes. An exclusive royal privilege for the exploitation of quartz deposits in the area was obtained from the government in 1806.

Ibáñez was killed in 1809 during the Peninsular War; administrative direction passed to his brother-in-law Francisco Azevedo. These were economically difficult years, with a stockroom full of unsold pieces, though some movement was generated by orders from A Coruña, Ferrol, the Rías Baixas, Biscay and Castile. The factory began to be called the Real Fábrica (Royal Factory), a title believed to have been authorised by Fernando VII from exile.

The characteristic pieces of this first period included the florero de dedos (finger-vase), as well as fish- and tree-shaped vases, pilgrim jugs, pharmacy jars decorated with relief work, and garden vases inspired by the ceramics of the Wedgwood factory. The period is also distinguished by a relief depicting the defence of the Parque de Monleón in Madrid, dedicated by Ibáñez to Fernando VII and now held in the National Archaeological Museum of Spain and the Museo de Pontevedra.

In 1832, Ibáñez's son José Ibáñez inherited the factory and was forced to close it given the unfavourable economic circumstances.

=== Second epoch (1835–1842) ===
On 19 May 1835, José Ibáñez entered into partnership with Antonio Tapia of Seville, forming the company Ibáñez y Tapia. Under the direction of the Frenchman M. Richard, who had arrived from Turin, they focused on the production of fine hand-painted white earthenware and undertook the first attempts at stamping and polychrome decoration. New workshops and kilns were added, and the factory's product range expanded to include lamps, candlesticks, plates with mythological and religious motifs, and the famous Mambrú jugs — pitchers modelled on a seated figure in the style of the English Toby jug. José Ibáñez died in 1836 and his widow, Anita Varela, took charge of the business until the factory's economic situation forced her to lease it in 1845.

=== Third epoch and golden age (1845–1862) ===
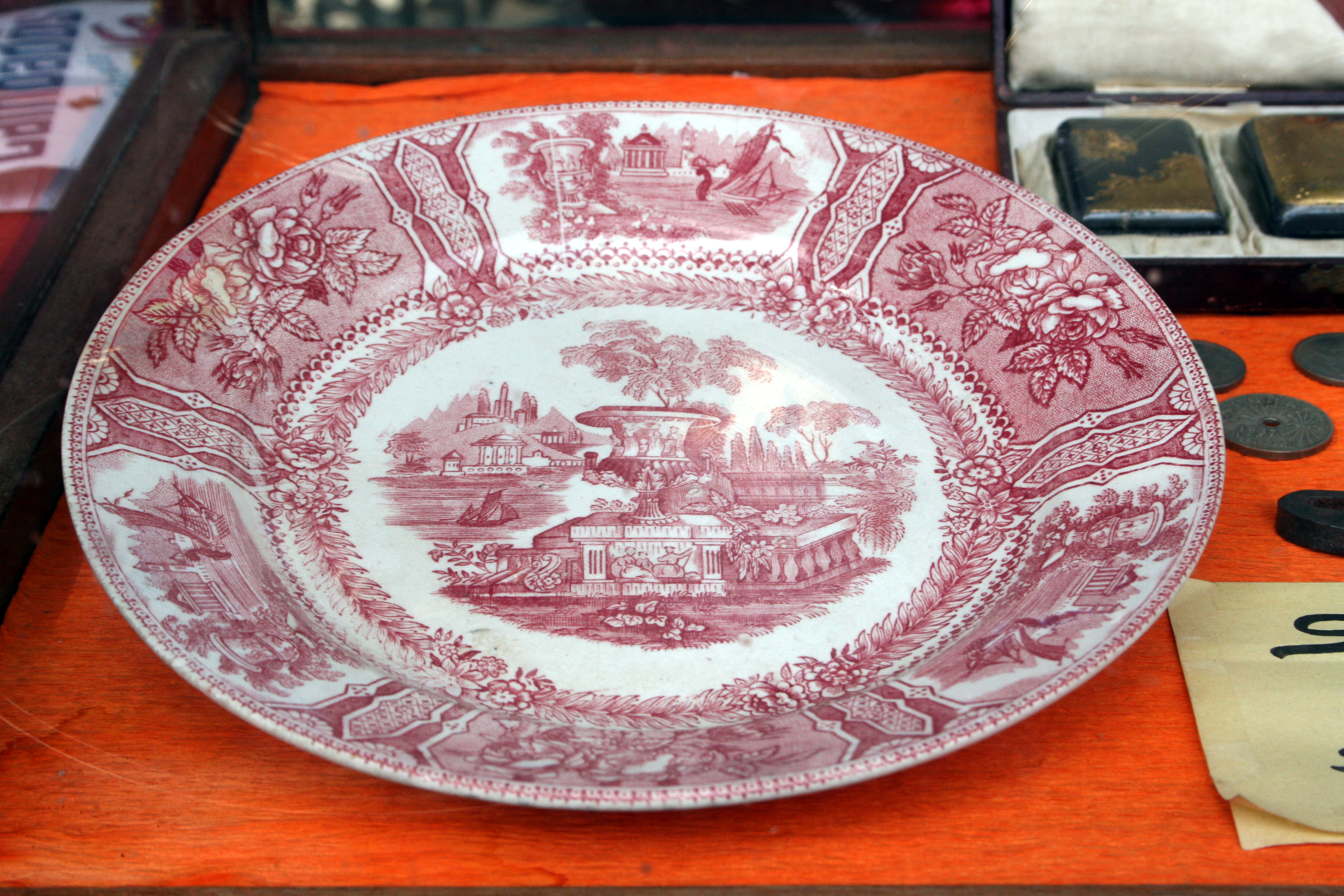
A Sargadelos plate from the third epoch (19th century), gondola series, in pink

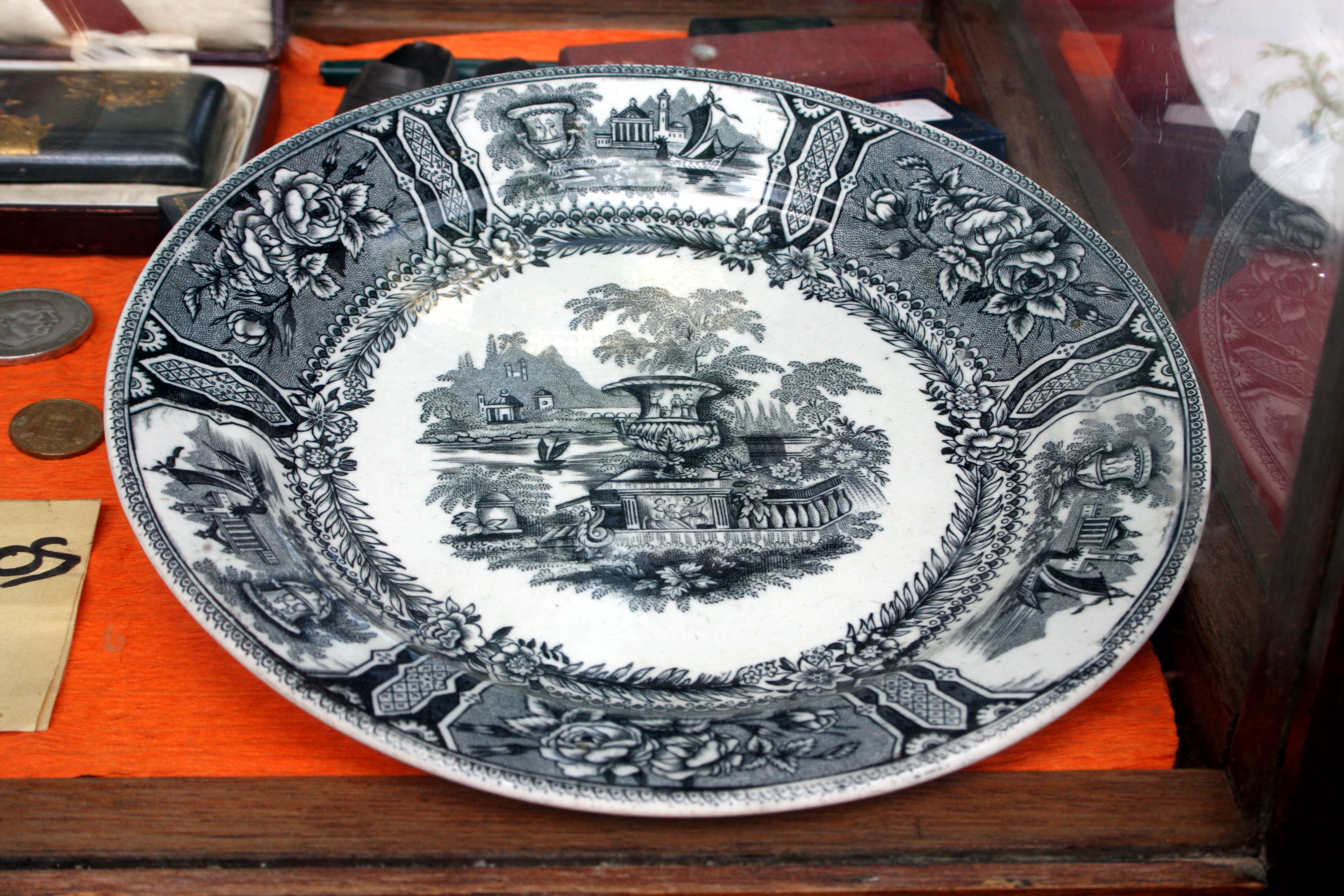
A Sargadelos plate from the third epoch (19th century), in black monochrome

In 1845, Luis de la Riva y Cía. of Santiago de Compostela leased the administration of Sargadelos from the Ibáñez family, beginning the factory's period of greatest splendour. By 1849, more than 1,000 families were working for the factory, which operated four distinct kilns, thirty drying ovens, nine large workshops, eight presses, and dispatched its products via 205 carts and 22 coastal vessels. Under the direction of the British ceramicist Edwin Forester and a group of ceramicists who arrived from Staffordshire in 1847, the factory achieved exceptional quality and variety in its tableware and figurines.

The decorative innovations of this period included monochrome stamp printing (particularly notable in black), the china opaca (opaque china) or semichinesa technique, an adaptation of the English flow blue style producing a slightly blurred or soft-focus appearance on chinoiserie designs, and painted polychrome on a stamped base in floral motifs in red, green, yellow and blue. The most celebrated decorative series of the epoch was the góndola pattern: a landscape scene with a balustrade, decorative urn, and lagoon with a gondola in the foreground, and fantastical architecture in the background. Also notable were tableware sets manufactured for Isabel II, part of which is exhibited in the Museo de Pontevedra.

=== Fourth epoch and closure (1870–1875) ===
The Ibáñez family returned to management of the factory in 1862, after which it entered a period of decline. The family lawsuits and lack of investment in new facilities, and the dismissal of foreign ceramics experts, led to an inability to match the quality of the previous era. The factory closed definitively in 1875.

=== Recovery and fifth epoch (from 1949) ===
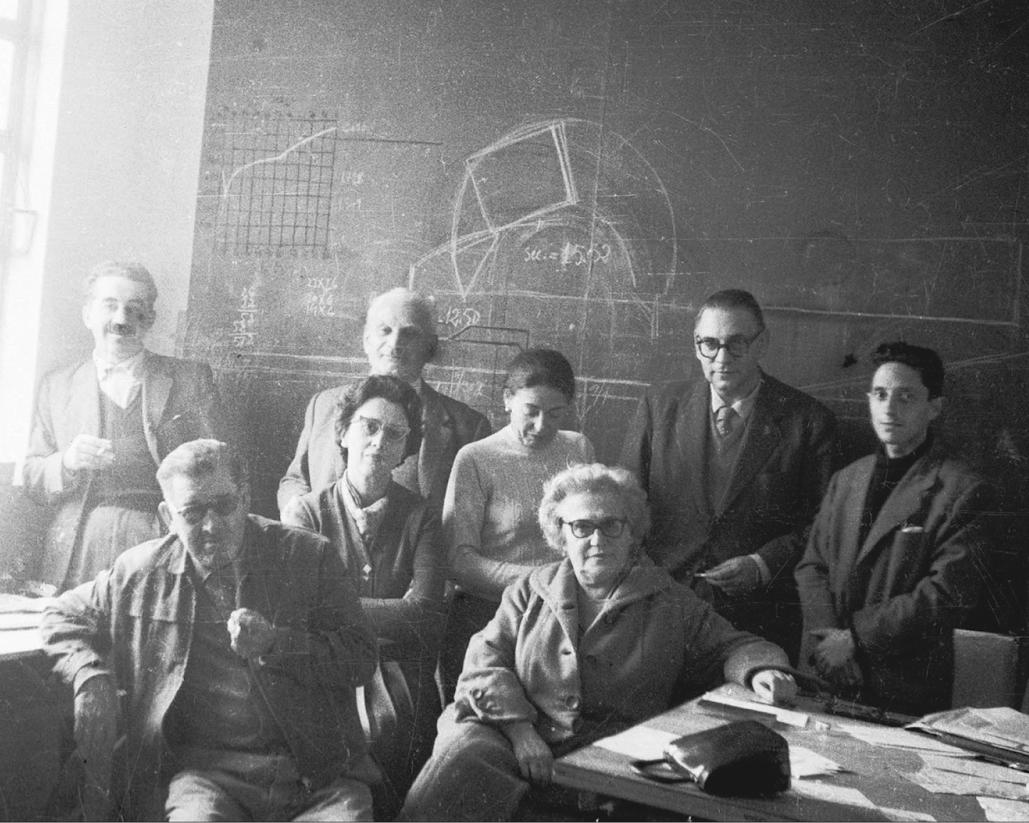
Luís Seoane (left) and Isaac Díaz Pardo (right) with the Núñez Búa, Sofovich and Scheimberg families in Magdalena, Argentina

In 1949, the painter, ceramicist, and Galicianist intellectual Isaac Díaz Pardo (1920–2012) opened a ceramics workshop at O Castro de Samoedo in Sada, which grew into the industrial complex known as Cerámicas do Castro. Díaz Pardo had been inspired by discovering in the 1940s a book by the Ferrol painter Felipe Bello Piñeiro (Cerámicas de Sargadelos, 1922) recounting the history of the original factories, and had gone on to investigate the excellent kaolin deposits of the area.

In 1955, Díaz Pardo travelled to Argentina, where he met a circle of Galician exiles including the painter Luís Seoane and others including Rafael Dieste, Lorenzo Varela, Xosé Núñez Búa, and Eduardo Blanco Amor. In 1955 he also established the Porcelanas de Magdalena factory, located around 100 kilometres from Buenos Aires, which operated until 1980. From these encounters and conversations, in 1963 Díaz Pardo and Seoane, along with architect Andrés Fernández-Albalat, founded the Laboratorio de Formas, a nonprofit initiative dedicated to reclaiming Galicia's artistic and historical memory through the study and application of Galician ceramic and visual forms. In 1970 Díaz Pardo and Seoane published the Manifiesto del Laboratorio de Formas, formalising their commitment to modern industrial design and cultural revival.

In 1964 the Laboratorio established the company Sargadelos Ltda., and in 1968 work began on a new circular factory building in Cervo, designed by architect Fernández-Albalat and inaugurated in 1970. The new factory was built adjacent to the ruins of the original complex, which in 1972 were declared a Bien de Interés Cultural (Historic-Artistic Site).

The cultural infrastructure developed around the project included the Museo Galego de Arte Contemporánea Carlos Maside in Sada, the publisher Ediciós do Castro, the Seminario de Sargadelos, and the Instituto Galego de Información. The Sargadelos galleries, opened across Galicia and in Madrid, Barcelona, Seville, Porto and Milan, served simultaneously as ceramics retail spaces and specialist bookshops in Galician and Portuguese literature.

Isaac Díaz Pardo directed the Grupo Sargadelos until the early 2000s, when a manoeuvre by other shareholders removed him from the decision-making positions he held. In 2004, Segismundo García took over direction of the group.

=== Financial difficulties and recent controversies ===
In November 2013 the company filed for creditor protection, applying a redundancy scheme that led to the dismissal of 70 workers. In March 2014 the company declared insolvency with debts of approximately 5 million euros. In February 2016 the company announced it had returned to profit and exited creditor proceedings, though it still faced debts of 5 million euros to be repaid over a period of five to twelve years.

In April 2025, the Labour Inspectorate identified 36 safety deficiencies at the Cervo factory, including occupational exposure to crystalline silica dust, which had caused silicosis in at least two workers. Segismundo García responded to a 5,000-euro fine and an order to remedy the deficiencies by announcing the immediate closure of the factory, barring workers from entering the premises. Following intervention by the Galician regional government, an agreement was reached for a resumption of production. In November 2025, following a second Labour Inspectorate visit, García announced a further temporary closure and imposed a short-term lay-off scheme affecting 86 workers before again reversing course after pressure from the regional government and trade unions.

== Products and design ==
Sargadelos ceramics are made from hard porcelain using fine kaolin clay sourced near the Cervo factory. All pieces are decorated and finished by hand after leaving the kilns. The characteristic aesthetic of the modern factory, developed under the Laboratorio de Formas, combines a white glaze with cobalt blue accents, drawing on pre-Roman and medieval Galician motifs, cruceiros (carved stone wayside crosses), mythological figures, and geometric patterns. The new Sargadelos also produced portrait series of figures from Galician and Spanish arts and literature, beginning with Rosalía de Castro and followed by Antonio Machado, Castelao, Unamuno, Valle-Inclán, Pérez Galdós, and Picasso, as well as medieval figures such as Master Mateo and María Pita.

== See also ==
- Isaac Díaz Pardo
- Luís Seoane
- Galician culture
- Os renovadores
