= Isaac Díaz Pardo =

Spanish artist (1920–2012)

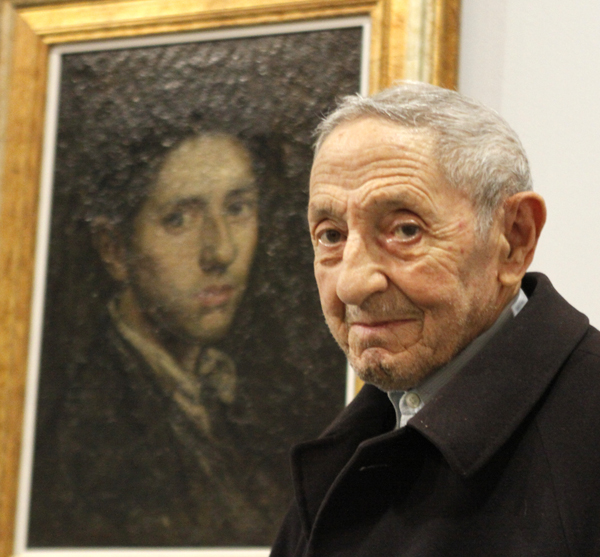
- Díaz Pardo
- Born: August 22, 1920; Ferrol, Galicia, Spain
- Died: January 5, 2012 (aged 91); Cerceda, Galicia, Spain

Isaac Díaz Pardo (22 August 1920 – 5 January 2012) was a Galician intellectual strongly attached to both Sargadelos and Cerámica do Castro.

== Background ==
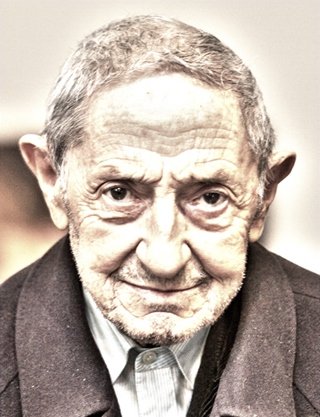
Isaac Díaz Pardo

He was an intellectual galicianist, painter, ceramist, designer, editor and businessman.

He was born in Santiago de Compostela and died in A Coruña.

In 2009, he received the Medalla de Oro al Mérito en las Bellas Artes (Gold Medal of Merit in Fine Arts) of Spain.

Isaac Díaz Pardo was the son of painter and scenographer Camilo Díaz Baliño. His childhood home was the venue for meetings connected to League of Friends of the Galician Language as Díaz Baliño was an active member. The meetings were attended by the likes of Castelao, Vicente Risco, Ramón Otero Pedrayo, Ramón Cabanillas, Antón Villar Ponte, Eduardo Blanco Amor and Francisco Asorey. He is considered part of the second generation of renovators of Galician art of the 20th century, known as Os renovadores (in Galician, the renovators).

Díaz Pardo's father was executed by the Nationalists soon after the beginning of the Spanish Civil War and he was forced into hiding in La Coruña, where he stayed with his uncle Indalecio and found work as a signwriter. After the war, he received a bursary from the Provincial Government of La Coruña that enabled him to study at the Royal Academy of Fine Arts of San Fernando in Madrid between 1939 and 1942.

He later taught at The Catalan Royal Academy of Fine Arts of Saint George in Barcelona, and began to exhibit in Spain (La Coruña, Madrid and Vigo) and abroad (Europe and The Americas). He then switched to ceramics, and founded Cerámicas do Castro factory with several partners. At this point he experimented with the raw materials used in original 19th century works by Antonio Raimundo Ibáñez Llano y Valdés (notably from Sargadelos and Cervo). This resulted in ceramics of high quality.

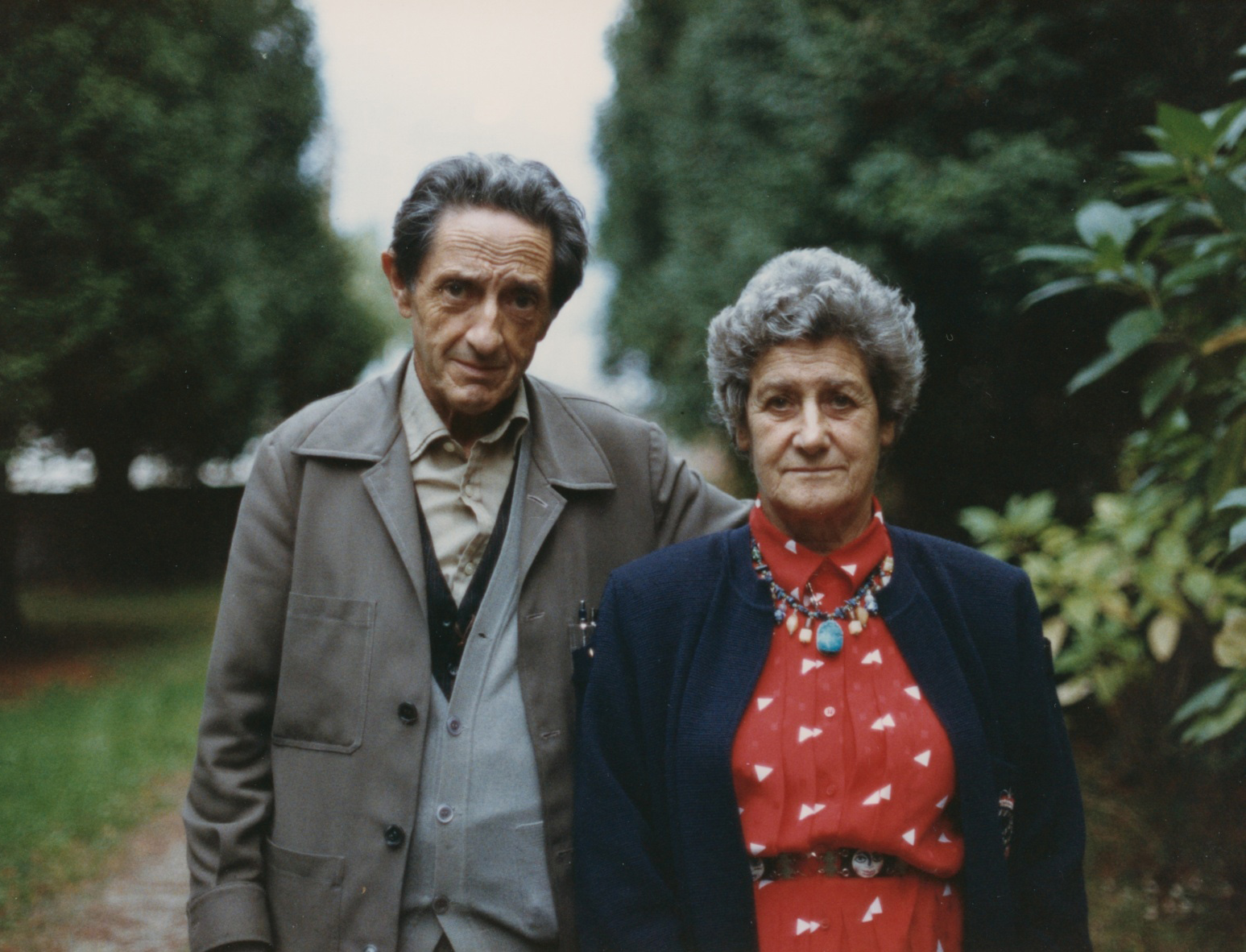
Isaac Diaz Pardo and his wife Carme Arias Montero.

In 1963, Isaac Díaz Pardo, with other prominent Galeguistas such as Luis Seoane, helped establish "Porcelanas de Magdalena", an experimental porcelain factory also known as "Laboratorio de Formas", in the town of Magdalena, Buenos Aires. This pioneering venture was a precursor to several industrial and cultural activities, including the revival of pottery production at Sargadelos, with the support of Cerámicas do Castro (1963), Museo Carlos Maside (1970), publishing house Ediciós do Castro (1963), the reinstated Seminario de Estudos Galegos (1970) and Instituto Galego de Información. Grupo Sargadelos remained under Díaz Pardo’s direction until the early 2000s, when a series of corporate manoeuvres by the other partners removed him from his position.

As an essay writer and critic, Díaz Pardo made notable contributions to Xente do meu Rueiro, O ángulo de pedra, Galicia Hoy (with Luis Seoane), Paco Pixiñas (with Celso Emilio Ferreiro), El Marqués de Sargadelos, and Castelao. He also published many articles in newspapers such as La Voz de Galicia.
