= The Carpenter's Pencil =

Book by Manuel Rivas

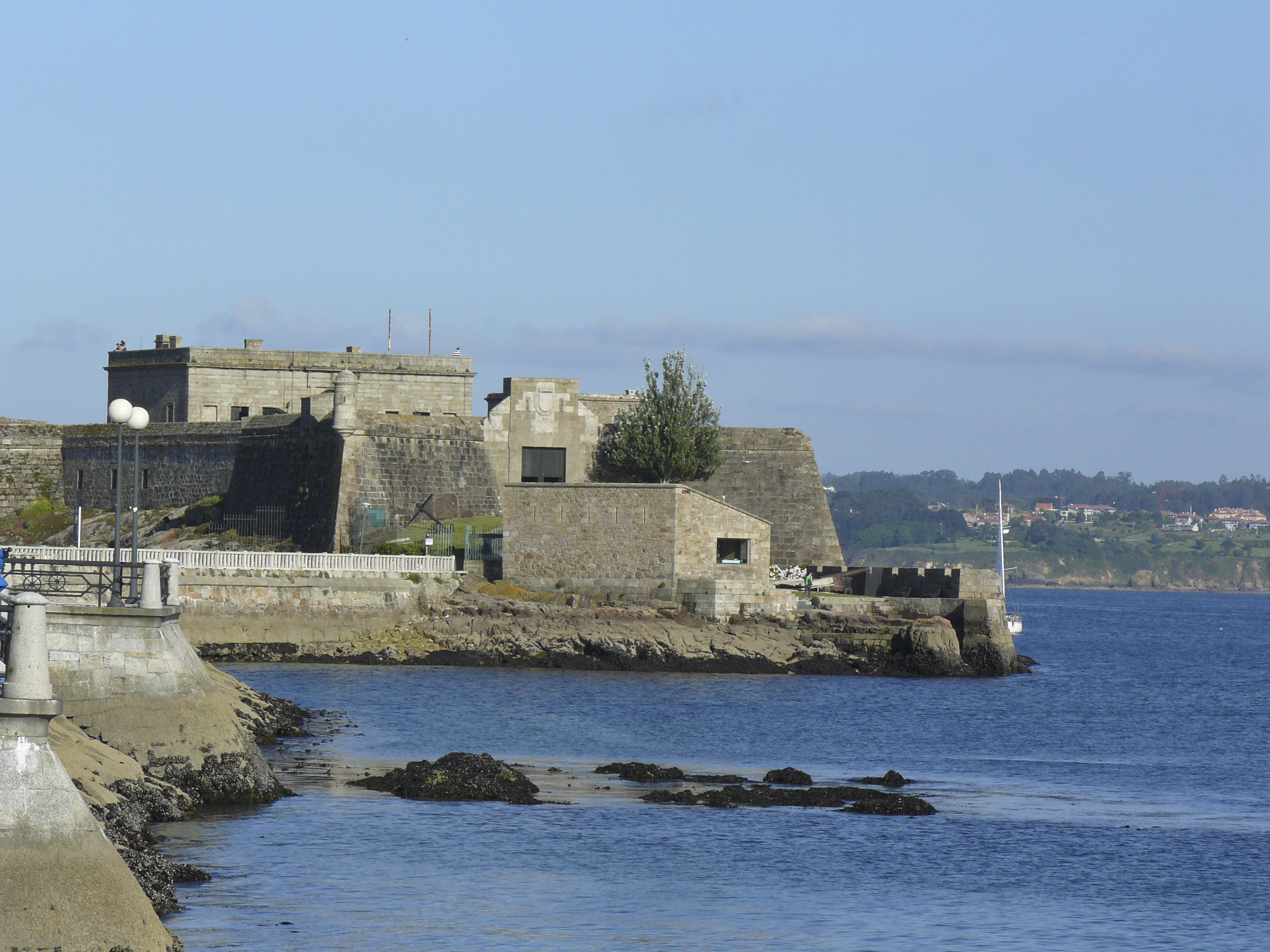
Castelo de San Antón A Coruña

The Carpenter's Pencil (O lapis do carpinteiro in Galician) is a book written by the Galician author Manuel Rivas. The story revolves around a young couple, Daniel Da Barca and Marisa Mallo. Their happiness is destroyed when Galicia falls under a Falangist dictatorship.

What follows is a poor summary of the book, but instead relies on the plot of a movie based on the Rivas's novel.

== The plot ==
Dr Daniel Da Barca is a left-wing political activist who believes that women should have the right to vote in Galicia. He attends many rallies and gives speeches, always accompanied by his devoted girlfriend Marisa Mallo. Unbeknown to Da Barca, he has been watched by Herbal, an agent for the Civil Guard. When the Falanxists take control of the country, Da Barca is arrested for his left wing ideals in Santiago de Compostela.

Meanwhile, Marisa's father Don Benito is trying to marry her off to Alejandro, a lieutenant in the Falanxist army. Marisa confides in her cousin, Laura that she cannot forget about Da Barca and is determined to get the condemned doctor out of prison. Beforehand Marisa had visited Daniel in the prison and he ordered her to forget about him and move on with her life.

The prison is run by the cruel and sadistic Zalo Puga, a high ranking Falanxist. Zalo is married to Herbal's sister, Beatriz. Zalo holds an intense and burning hatred for all left wingers, and especially Da Barca.

When the prisoner, Gonzalo Rincon is tortured and murdered by Zalo and two other Falanxists he drops his pencil, which is picked up by Herbal. The Civil Guard keeps the pencil for his own.

Meanwhile, Da Barca has been allowed to help out in the prison ward, due to his medical practices. He works alongside a nun Mother Izarne, with whom Da Barca develops a genuine friendship and Dr Solans. Solans has been stealing morphine from the ward to feed his own addiction to the drug.

It soon becomes clear to Da Barca, that most of the prisoners could be cured of their illness by a healthy diet such as fruit. When he tries to acquire this, he is beaten by Herbal and the other guards.

Marisa is desperate to secure Da Barca's release, and pleads with her father to write to his influential friends to negotiate the doctor's release. Don Benito refuses, and Marisa attempts suicide. She fails in her attempt and it is this act, that finally convinces Don Benito to write letters. He hands them to Marisa, and tells her to deliver them to his friends like the Archbishop of Santiago and The Mayor of Vigo. Marisa delivers them happily, unbeknown that her father has actually betrayed her. In the letter, Benito has written that Da Barca must be executed for the good of the Falanxist cause.

The movie continues with Da Barca trying to survive the harsh and brutal conditions in the prison, whilst at the same time trying to help his fellow inmates through illness and despair.

== Other ==
The book was adapted into a feature-length film starring Luis Tosar and Tristan Ulloa. Part of the story is based on the life of the cartoonist Camilo Díaz Baliño.

== See also ==
- The Carpenter's Pencil (film)
