= Luís Seoane =

Argentine artist (1910–1979)

Luís Seoane López
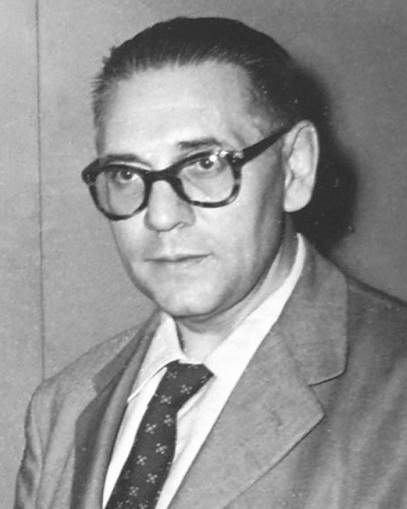
- Born: June 1, 1910; Buenos Aires, Argentina
- Died: April 5, 1979 (aged 68); A Coruña, Spain
- Movement: Expressionism
- Spouse: María Elvira Fernández López

Luis Seoane (1910–1979) was a Galician artist and writer. Born in Buenos Aires, Argentina, on June 1, 1910, of Galician immigrants, he spent much of his childhood and youth in Galicia (Spain). He was educated in A Coruña. His first exhibition was held in 1929. He is usually included in the group of Os renovadores, the renovators of Galician art in the first third of the 20th century.

Returning to Argentina in 1936 to escape the Spanish Civil War, Seoane became an important cultural figure in Buenos Aires, where he was responsible for the creation of a number of murals and other public works of art.

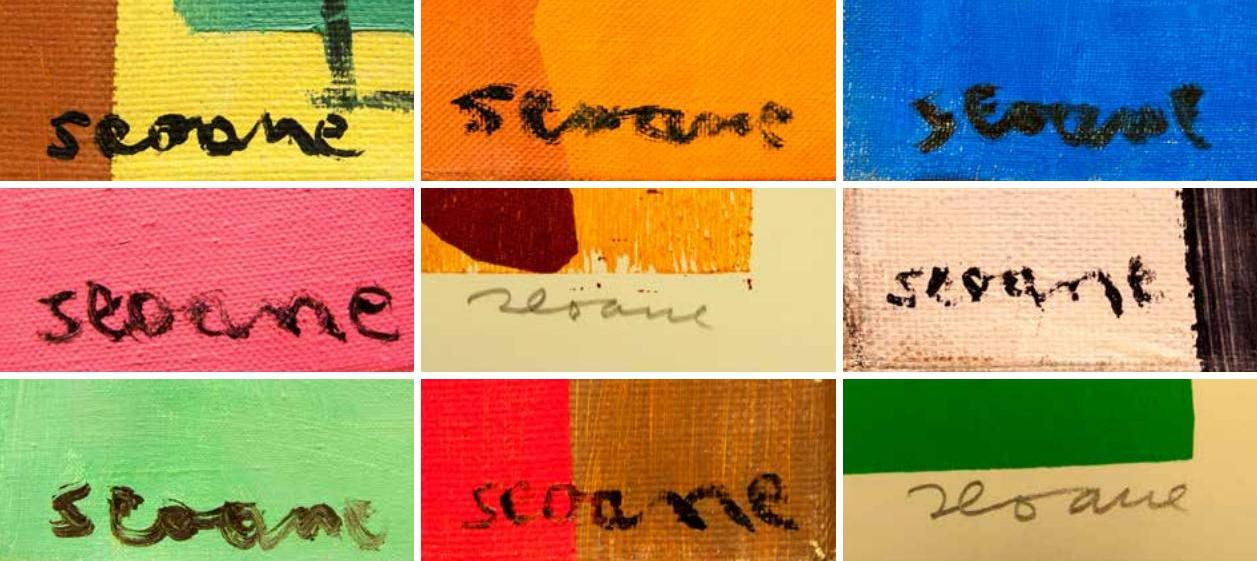
Signatures

On his return to Galicia in 1960, he became a leading figure within the movement to revive Galician culture. He died in A Coruña in 1979.
