= Manuel Rivas =

Spanish writer (born 1957)

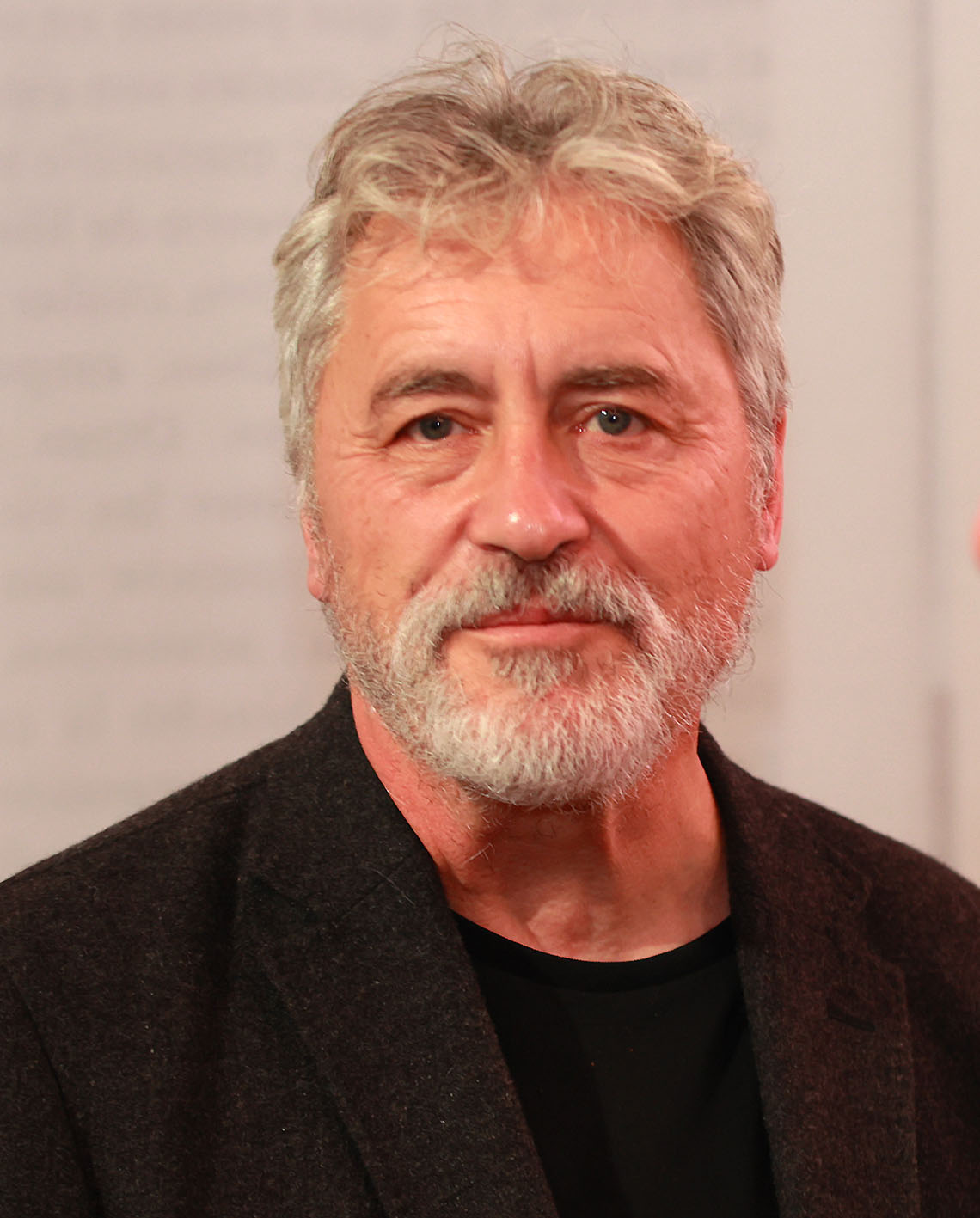
Manuel Rivas, 2022

Manuel Rivas Barrós (born 24 October 1957 in A Coruña, Galicia) is a Galician writer, poet and journalist.

== Biography ==
Manuel Rivas Barrós began his writing career at the age of 15. He has written articles and literary essays for Spanish newspapers and television stations including Television de Galicia, El Ideal Gallego, La Voz de Galicia, El País, and was the sub-editor of Diario 16 in Galicia. He was a founding member of Greenpeace Spain and played an important role during the 2002 Prestige oil spill near the Galician coast.

== Work ==
As of 2017, Rivas has published 9 anthologies of poetry, 14 novels and several literature essays. He is considered a revolutionary in contemporary Galician literature. His 1996 book ¿Que me queres, amor?, a series of sixteen short stories, was adapted by director José Luis Cuerda for his film La lengua de las mariposas. His 1998 novel O lapis do carpinteiro has been published in nine countries and is the most widely translated work in the history of Galician literature. It also was adapted to cinema as O lapis do carpinteiro.

== Bibliography ==
Poems

- Libro de Entroido (1979)
- Balada nas praias do Oeste (1985)
- Mohicania (1987)
- Ningún cisne (1989)
- O pobo da noite (1996)
- Do descoñecido ao descoñecido. Obra poética (1980-2003) (2003)
- El pueblo de la noche y mohicania revisitada. (2004)
- A desaparición da neve. (2009)
- A boca da terra. (2015)

Novels

- Todo ben (1985)
- Un millón de vacas (1989), premio da Crítica
- Os comedores de patacas (1991)
- En salvaxe compaña (1994)
- ¿Que me queres, amor? (1996)
- Bala perdida (1997)
- O lapis do carpinteiro (1998) ("The Carpenter's Pencil" (2003))
- Ela, maldita alma (1999)
- A man dos paíños (2000)
- Galicia, Galicia (2001)
- As chamadas perdidas (2002)
- Contos de Nadal (2004)
- Os libros arden mal (2006) ("Books Burn Badly" (2010))
- Todo é silencio (2010) ("All is Silence" (2013))
- As voces baixas (2012) ("The Low Voices" (2017))

Essays

- "El bonsái atlántico" (1994)
- "El periodismo es un cuento" (1997)
- "Toxos e flores" (1999)
- "Galicia, Galicia" (2001)

== Awards ==
- Galician Critics Prize
- Spanish National Narrative Prize
- Spanish Critic Prize
- Prize of the Belgian section of Amnesty International
- Torrente Ballester Prize
- Arcebispo Xoán de San Clemente e o da Crítica Prize
- ONCE Prize - Galicia and Solidarity
- Xarmenta 2007
