= Enrique Nicanor =

Spanish television producer (1944–2025)

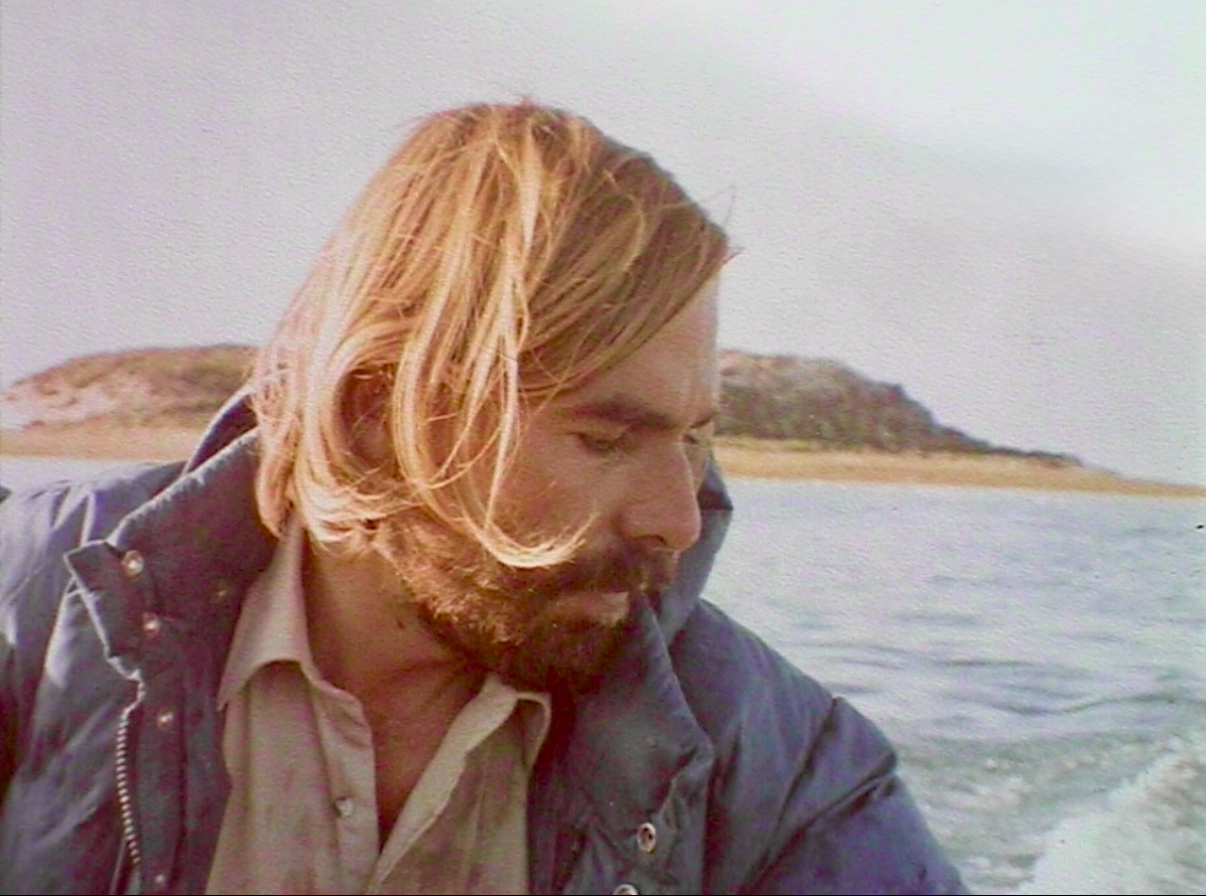
- Enrique Nicanor, Patagonia, 1983
- Born: 5 December 1944
- Died: 8 July 2025 (aged 80)
- Occupations: Film director, producer, writer, designer
- Years active: 1960–2025
- Spouse: Cayetana Mulero
- Children: Maria and Cayetana

Enrique Nicanor (5 December 1944 – 8 July 2025) was a Spanish film and television producer and director, writer and designer best known for his works for public service broadcasting as Director of TVE-2, the Spanish Public TV and the creation of Caponata and Perezgil, the Spanish muppets of Sesame Street (Barrio Sésamo). He began as a designer and film animation director in Cuba in 1959. Based in Paris (1965) and Spain (1967), he was board member and President of INPUT-TV, The International Public TV Conference and film trainer at EAVE, The European Producers' workshop and the European Commission Learning Network. He was an independent producer from 1988 until his death in 2025.

== Background ==
The son of a Galician family of modest landowners, Nicanor's parents emigrated after the Spanish Civil war to New York joining their family there. In 1950 the family established their home in Havana where he studied Fine Arts at The National School of Fine Arts Escuela Nacional de Bellas Artes "San Alejandro" and Philosophy and History of Arts at the University of Havana. In 1965 the family left Cuba and he went to Paris to work as animation director and cameraman with producer Serge Danot. In 1967, Mr. Adolfo Suárez, Director of the recently created Spanish Public TV (RTVE), invited E. Nicanor to come back to Spain and join the new institution where he produced and directed films and documentaries till 1983 becoming that year Director of the channel. In 1988 he left the Spanish institution to work internationally as an independent producer/consultor promoting public broadcasting service within institutions such as INPUT-TV, collaborating as professional film trainer at EAVE the European Audiovisual workshop and producing for international television channels.

Nicanor died on 13 July 2025, at the age of 80.

== Early works in Cuba and France ==
- 1959, Cartoonist and designer for the Cuban newspaper Prensa Libre and the weekly magazine Bohemia at the time that Cuban Revolution changed the political power.
- 1960, Founder, Animator and Director of the Animation Department of ICAIC - Instituto Cubano de Arte e Industria Cinematográficos together with artists Jesús de Armas, Tulio Raggi, Eduardo Muñoz-Bachs, Modesto García, Hernán Henríquez, Harry Read, Jorge Carruana, Wichy R. Nogueras, Paco Prats and other pioneers who created the first Cuban animation films.
- 1965, director, animator and cameraman with producer Serge Danot, co-producer Ivor Wood and scenographer Rafael Esteve for the Public French TV (ORTF) programme series The Magic Roundabout.

== Filmography Cuba (ICAIC) ==
Year	Title	Spanish title	Description	Notes
1960	a-e-i-o-u	a-e-i-o-u	Animation on the first letters of the alphabet	Animator with Hernán Henriquez
1961	Ogu, the Primitive Man	Ogú, el hombre primitivo[	Animation on the discovery of solidarity	Director, animation by Hernán Henriquez and Jorge Carruana
1963	The Paper Bird	El gallito de papel	Animation on toys' war and peace	Designer, directed by Jorge Carruana, animator Wichy Nogueras
1965	Macrotí, a Cuban Noah	Macrotí, un Noé cubano	Animation on the Cuban aborigin story of Noah's Ark	Animator, directed by Tulio Raggi
1965	Two Men	Dos hombres	Animation on the dangers of human greed	Story by Fernando Villaverde

== Filmography France, (ORTF) ==
Year	Title	French title	Description	Starring
1965/1966	The Magic Roundabout	Le Manège Enchanté	Puppet animation series for small children / Serge Danot Productions, for ORTF, broadcast later by BBC, UK	Pollux, Margot, Zebulon, Pere Pivoine, Flappy, Ambroise Music by Alan Legrand

== Filmography Spain, RTVE ==
- In 1967, Mr. Adolfo Suárez, Director of the recently created Spanish Public TV (RTVE), invited E. Nicanor to come back to Spain and join the new institution. He produced the Children series "The Adventures of Mumu the Bull", a new puppet animation series and started the channel production of documentaries, series and programmes in film format until 1983 when he became Channel director of TVE-2.

Year	Title	Spanish title	Description/network	Starring
1967	The Adventures of Mumu the Bull	Las Aventuras de Mumú	Animation puppet series for small children, 26 Episodes	Mumú, Lolita, Mondoñedo, D. Tontón
1967	First Day of School	El primer dia de escuela	First "free cinema" Doc. for TVE on education / Ramiro de Maetzu School	Host: Ivan Tubau
1967	Images to Learn	Imágenes para saber	Weekely cultural magazine / Film segments co-director with video Director Ricardo Arias	First appearance in TV of Félix Rodríguez de la Fuente
1968	School Television	Televisión escolar	School daily magazine / Film segments co-director with video Director Ricardo Arias	Felix Rodríguez de la Fuente, Carmen Esther, Manolo Portillo...

== Cómo es Cómo se hace ==
scripts: Justo Merino, voice-over: Eufrasio Zúñiga
Episode	Title	Spanish title	Description	Location
1 (1968)	The Olive Oil	El aceite de oliva	From the historic plantation of the olive trees to the bottle	Jaén, Andalusia
2	Bread	El Pan	From collecting wheat to baker's work and distribution	Madrid
3	Ceramic	La cerámica	Traditional Spanish pottery	Bailén, Andalusia
4	Wood Furniture	Un mueble de madera	From cutting the tree to the carpenter's hand-craft	Almagro
5	A Spanish Guitar	Una guitarra española	The secret process of combining woods and crafts to get music sounds	Ramírez Guitars, Madrid
6	The Paper	El papel	From the collecting of wood to our desktop	Sarrió, Leiza, Navarre
7	An Electric Dam	Una central eléctrica	Transforming water river flow into power	Central del Duero, Extremadura
8	A Nuclear Power Plant	Una planta nuclear	The process of transforming uranium into electric power	Vandellós, Tarragona
9	The Japanese Lacquerware	La laca japonesa	with Prof. Ramon Sarsanedas, Escola Massana	Barcelone
10	A Jewel	Una joya	Goldsmith and arts at the Escola Massana,	Barcelone
11	An Art Collection	Una colección de arte	Museum Frederic Marés Frederic Marés Museum, himself	Barcelone
12	A Newspaper	Un periódico	The printing of La Vanguardia	Barcelone
13	A Classic Spa	Un balneario	Mondariz	Vigo, Galicia
14	An experimental farm	Una granja Experimental	Granxa do Louro	Porriño, Galicia
15	Growing Sea-food	La pesca del marisco	with Alvaro Cunqueiro (writer)	O Grove, Vigo, Galicia
16	A Galician Back-pipe	Una gaita gallega	traditional Galician craft-maker	Pontevedra
17	The Galician Camellia	La camelia gallega	Planting, growing and caring camellias	A Coruña, Galicia
18	A Public Park	Un parque	Caring and life of a park. Parque Güell	Barcelona
19	A Fabric	La tela	From the thread to the fabric. Industrial knitting	Barcelona
20	Orchids in a Green House	Un vivero de orquideas.	"El inglés" Green house	Nerja, Málaga
21	Inshore Fishing	La pesca de bajura	Fishermen fleet working close to the coast	Málaga
22	A Spanish Sword	Una espada española	Forgering traditional Toledan steel. Felix' forgery	Toledo
23	A Medieval Spanish Armor	Una armadura medieval	Forgering and decorating traditional Toledan steel	Toledo
24	Toledan Goldsmith	El damasquinado	Toledan / Arab traditional goldsmith	Toledo
25	Recording and printing a Vinil Disk	Un disco de vinilo	On the industry of music	Madrid
26	Modeling a Statue	El modelado en barro	The artistic process to create a statue	Bailén, Andalusia
27	The Art Restoration	La restauración artística	Instituto de Restauración Artística	Madrid
28	A Supersonic Combat Airplane	Un avión de combate supersónico	The Saeta aircraft by CASA	Seville
29 (1971)	A Radio Broadcast	Una emisora de radio	Radio Popular with Tip y Coll and Alfonso Eduardo	Madrid
30 (1972)	How Television is made (Part 1)	La televisión (episodio 1)	TVE, Prado del Rey	Madrid
31 (1972)	How Television is made (Part 2)	La televisión (episodio 2)	TVE, Prado del Rey	Madrid

Stand alone films and programmes
Episode	Title	Spanish title	Description	Notes
1970	Front Page: Mexico: Luis Echeverria president	A toda plana: Elecciones en México. Would presidente Luís Echeverría re-establish relations with Franco's Spain?	Documentary on President Luis Echeverria takeover ceremony and possible re-establishing diplomatic relations.	Commissioned by Eduardo Sancho
1970	Cheste a Cell of New Families	Cheste, una célula universitaria para nuevas familias	New education at the Cheste Labour University, Cheste, Valencia	Host: Eduardo Sancho
1970	Galileo Galilei	Galileo Galilei	Pilot for the series The History of Science	Scientific advisor: Dr. Roberto Saumells
1973	Trip to the Moon	Viaje a la luna (de Cyrano de Bergerac)	Fiction episode for the series "La Comparsa"	Gabriel Fariza, Miriam de Maeztu, Juan Margallo, Marcelo Rubal
1973	The Hunting of the Snark	La caza del Snark (by Lewis Carroll)	Fiction episode for the series "La Comparsa"	Francisco Merino and Quique San Francisco
1976	Platero and I, Juan Ramón Jiménez	Platero y yo, Juan Ramón Jiménez	Fiction episode for the series "Books" (Los libros)	Script by Miguel Marías and Enrique Nicanor Agustín González, Gerardo Maya, Ana de Yebra
1979	The Invasion of the Street Comediants	Els Comediants invaden la ciudad	Special programme representing TVE at the Montreux TV Music Festival	Theater group Els Comediants
1982-1983	Robinson	Robinson	Youth weekly magazine for literature and games	Felicidad Orquín, Gabriel Fariza. Ondas TV Award'82

== The Rules of the Game ==
Produced in 1976, Broadcast 1977-1978 On the theory by host: José Antonio Jáuregui
Broadcast	Title	Spanish title	Description	Notes
October 4, 1977	The TRIBAL Man	Homo Tribalis	The human feelings that count. Beyond economics, politics and Marx theories	Galicia, Cairo, Tokio, NYC
October 11, 1977	LAND	LA TIERRA	The feeling of belonging to a land or place. Nationalism conflicts	Israel-Palestine conflict, Lebanon war, UK-Spain Gibraltar conflict
1018/77	LANGUAGE	LA LENGUA	The feeling of ownership or belonging to our language	with Camilo José Cela, Guillermo Cabrea Infante, Alvaro Cunqueiro
October 25, 1977	RACE	LA RAZA	Racial conflicts is/was determined by tribal feelings?	Lebanon'75 war, Hiroshima, Auschwitz
November 1, 1977	HISTORY	LA HISTORIA	The tribal way that History adapts its different stories	USA, France, Japan, UK,
11/04877	RELIGION	LA RELIGIÓN	Tribal uses of all religions	The Vatican, Judaism, Muslims, Budism . Shot in Italy, Japan, Israel, Palestine
November 15, 1977	THE TYPES	LOS TIPOS	Tribal kind of personalities developed through times	Tribal kinds of human characters
December 3, 1977	POLITICS	LA POLITICA	How tribal feelings work, are used and determine politics	Political parties, unions, press, monarchy and democracy
December 10, 1977	ECOLOGY AND DRESS	ECOLOGÍA Y VESTIDO	The way fashion determines own attachments to the way we dress	Our way of dressing according to our tribe
December 17, 1977	TOTEM	THE TOTEM	Totems of contemporary society: flags, kings and other social "symbols"	Contemporary societies also have totems
December 24, 1977	ECONOMICS	LA ECONOMIA	National of global economy. How it works.	When coins tell us that we belong to...
December 31, 1977	WAR	LA GUERRA	Tribalism in wars in old and contemporary society	Are wars simply tribal matters?
January 7, 1978	EMPIRE	EL IMPERIO	Tribal reasons or use of Empires in old and contemporary society	Grece, Rome, Spanish Empire, British Empire, USA imperialism
February 21, 1978	FOOD AND ART	LA COMIDA Y EL ARTE	Own food or international food habits how they work	Why my country food is better than the others. Music folklore and nationalisms
June 18, 1978	EPILOGUE: TIBAL 1	EPILOGO: TRIBAL 1	Summary of the series part one	Summary of the whole series 1
June 25, 1978	EPILOGUE: TRIBAL 2	EPILOGO: TRIBAL 2	Summary of the series part 2	Summary of the whole series 2

== Barrio Sésamo ==
Broadcast	Title	Description	starring
1979–1980	BARRIO SESAMO	First Sesame Street Spanish co-prod with CTW featuring Spanish characters and muppets	Emma Cohen as "Caponata", Jesús Alacaide as "Perezgil", Gabriel Fariza, Concha Goyanes, Juan Margallo, Petri Martínez ...

== Noah's Ark / El arca de Noé, series on wildlife and nature ==
(1983) Series Director: José L. Cuerda, 4 episodes by E. Nicanor on nature and wildlife of the Argentinian Patagonia
Episode	Title	Spanish title	Description	Notes
	Opening titles of the series	Cabecera de la serie		Music by Pepe Nieto
1	Wild Patagonia	Patagonia salvaje	Terrestrial wild life of Patagonia	Scientific advisor and text: Joaquín Araújo. Argentinian advisor: Francisco Erice
2	Whales of Patagonia, The Right-South Whale	La ballena Franca del Sur	Life, migration, mating and birth of the Right-South whale	Scientific advisor and text: Joaquín Araújo. Argentinian advisor: Francisco Erice
3	Sea Wolves and Seals of Patagonia	Harenes en la costa	Sea Wolves and Seals living habits on the coast of Península Valdés	Scientific advisor and text: Joaquín Araújo. Argentinian advisor: Francisco Erice
4	Birds of Patagonia	Pájaros de Patagonia	Penguins, cormorants, petrels and skubas way of life	Series scientific advisor and text: Joaquín Araújo. Argentinian advisor in place: Francisco Erice

== 1983, Head of the Children Programmes Unit at RTVE ==
Source:

== 1983-1987 Channel Director for TVE-2, the Cultural channel of RTVE ==
New programmes created for the channel / commissioned to TVE directors and independent production companies
Year	Title	Spanish	Description	Director / Host	Starring
1983/1987	BODY TUNNING	PUESTA A PUNTO	First workout daily program in Spain / TVE-2		Host: Eva Nasarre
1983/1987	FOLLOW ME	FOLLOW ME	First Spanish English teaching in Co-production with BBC	UK franchise/co-prod	Spanish and British professors
1983/1987	WITH THE HANDS IN THE DOUGH	CON LAS MANOS EN LA MASA	First daily cooking program in Spain hosting art and culture personalities / TVE-2	Host: Elena Santonja	Celebrity writers, painters, actors, musicians, poets
1983/1987	THE GOLDEN AGE	LA EDAD DE ORO	Late-night show on contemporary art and cutting-edge music bands / TVE-2	Host: Paloma Chamorro	International and Spanish pop, rock, avant-garde bands with interviews to cutting-edge artists and celebrities
1983/1987	IF I WERE PRESIDENT	SI YO FUERA PRESIDENTE	Late-night show on politics and weird folk music bands / TVE-2	Hosts: Fernado G. Tola & Carmen Maura	interviews with politicians and social influencers
1983/1987	TATOO	TATUAJE	Avantgarde art and literature magazine		Writers and artists on avant-garde mood
1983/1987	ASSIGNED COUNSEL	TURNO DE OFICIO	113 Episodes Fiction series to promote understanding of law and citizen rights	Director: Antonio Mercero	Juan Echanove, Juan Luis Galiardo, Carmen Elías, Irene Gutiérrez Caba
1983/1987	METROPOLIS	Metrópolis	weekly magazine on contemporary art, design and digital media. Continuing on TVE at present times	Alejandro Lavilla	Artists such as Daniel Canogar, Marina Núñez, Félix Fernández, Andrés Senra, Diana Larrea, Mr. Trazo, Equipo Moral, Txuspo Poyo, Enrique Marty, Luis Cerveró, DosJotas, Mónica Blas, Lope Serrano, Marc Gómez del Moral, Carles Santos and many more...
1983/1987	lit: "What Do We Paint Here?", which colloquially means, "What Business Have We Here?"	¿Qué pintamos aquí?	13 Episodes series on 13 Spanish contemporary painters	Director: Benito Rabal Host: Francisco Rabal	13 Painters: Jacinto Esteva, Antonio López, Lucio Muñoz, Eusebio Sempere, Carmen Laforet, Jose Hernández, Antón Llamazares, among others
1984/1987	At Midnight	A medianoche	First time daily News programme at TVE-2	Host Felipe Mellizo	Daily News and Current Affairs at midnight
1983/1987	JAZZ AMONG FRIENDS	Jazz entre amigos	Weekly jazz international bands magazine	Host: Juan Claudio Cifuentes	International jazz bands, concerts and interviews to Jazz artists
1983/1987	BULLETIN BOARD	Tablón de Anuncios	Youth weekly magazine	Director: Adolfo Dufour Host: Felicidad Orquín	Second season of the weekly magazine
1983/1987	Sighs of Spain	SUSPIROS DE ESPAÑA (Telematón)	Weekly magazine offering one free min. of speech on TV to ordinary people	Director: Gonzalo Sebastián de Erice	Real people in towns and streets talk what they like
1983/1987	SEFARDI FOLK SONGS	Cancionero Sefardita español	First collection of traditional Sephardi folk songs	Director: G. Soli	More than 1.000 rescued Sephardi songs
1983/1987	LET'S TALK ABOUT LOVE	Hablemos de Amor	Weekly talk-show on love and sex relations	Hosts: Ivan Tubau Margarita Riviere	First time love and sex relations on Spanish TV

== President of INPUT-TV, The International Public TV Conference ==
- 1983, Elected member of the Board of INPUT-TV, The Public TV International Conference, invited by the founders of the institution, Howard Klein (Rockefeller Foundation), Mike Fentiman(BBC) Jim Day (WNET-PBS), Sergio Borelli (RAI) and Michel Anthonioz (ARTE).
- 1987, Hosted and organised the INPUT-TV International Conference held in 1987-Granada, Spain.
- 1995, Hosted and organised the INPUT-TV International Conference held in 1995-San Sebastian, Spain.
- 1997, Elected President of INPUT-TV. He held the Conferences of 1997-Nantes, France, 1998-Stuttgart, Germany, 1999-Fort Worth, USA, 2000-Halifax, Canada and 2001-Cape Town, South Africa.

== European Institutions, EAVE and the MEDIA Programme ==
- 1987, Appointed Commissioner for European Audiovisual policies at the Spanish Ministry of Culture. He organised the "First European Year of Cinema" ceremony at Madrid under the presidency of Mme. Simone Veil and the King and Queen of Spain.
- Hosted the first international meeting of the Media Programme Initiative at the Barcelona Film Festival’87.
- 1987, Joined the foundational group of EAVE, The European Audiovisual Training Programme together with European producers Raymond Ravar, Eckart Stein, Jacques Bidou, Luciano Gloor and Marcia Lerner, working as Group Leader and representing Spain as National Coordinator.
- As EAVE National Coordinator he hosted the EAVE workshops:
1. EAVE 1999-Madrid
2. EAVE 2001-Seville
3. EAVE 2003- A Coruña
4. EAVE 2005-Santiago de Compostela
- As Head of Studies he organised "EAVE Arc Atlantic" and "EAVE Alpes-Rhine" for European Regions together with EAVE expert and producer Jacqueline Pierreux:
1. EAVE 1995 in Lisbon
2. EAVE 1996, in Besançon, Saarbrücken and Torino.
3. EAVE 2005 La Coruña, Brest and Cardiff

== Independent films and documentaries ==
Year	Title	Spanish	Description/network	Starring
1992	THE WAY-OUT OF THE LABYRINTH	La salida del laberinto	Episode for the series Chronicles of Evil	Javier Bardem, Germán Cobos, Eva Cobo
1998	FEDERICO GARCÍA LORCA, FAMILY PORTRAIT	Federico García Lorca, retrato de familia.	Biopic of Lorca on the Centenary of his birth, directed by John Healey, produced by RTVE, Arte	Christopher Maurer, Edward Albee, Stephen Levine, Lorca family. Interviews by John Healey
2000	MYSTERIES OF THE GALICIAN BOTAFUMEIRO [Thurible]	El misterio del Botafumeiro de Santiago de Compostela	Discovery Communications	
2001	THE PORT WINE	El vino de Oporto	Discovery Communications	
2002	MYSTERIES OF YÚCATAN: The CENOTES	Misterios de Yucatán, los cenotes	Discovery Communications	Alejandro Saldaña main diver and explorer
2003	THE CORK OF PORTUGAL	El corcho de Portugal	Discovery Communications	
2003	PLANET MARS IN THE EARTH: RIO TINTO	Rio Tinto, Marte en la Tierra	Discovery Communications	Ricardo Amils, Carol Stoker, Hitchell Sogin, Jonathan Trent, Jochen Broks and Roger Buick. Co-directed with Manuela Gutierrez
2011	TAGORE, CÉSAIRE, NERUDA, FOR UNIVERSAL HUMANISM	Tagore, Césaire, Neruda, por un humanismo universal	About Humanism by the 3 Nobel awarded writers/poets for UNESCO	Rabindranath Tagore, Aimé Césaire and Pablo Nerudaa, Opening speech by D.G. Irina Bukova
2012	YOU MUST BE NUTS, The Business of Dementia	¿Te has vuelto loc@? El Negocio de la demencia	Investigative doc. on Alzheimer and nutrition	In assoc. with Inner Eye, Prod. UK. / Kaberi and Obhi Chatterjee

== Interviews within films and programmes ==
Year	Name	Specialty	Description	Programme / Network
1966	Andrés Segovia	Guitarist	On his life and development of the guitar' music into the orchestra, at his countryside house in Málaga	For the series The Guitar, TVE
1968?	Salvador Dalí	Artist, painter	On himself, at his countryside house, Port Bou	For the varieties show "Everything is possible on Sunday" TVE
1970	Alvaro Cunqueiro	Galician Writer	On the values and varieties of Galician food	For the episode "Growing Sea-food" of the series How it is, How to do it. TVE
1971	Frederic Marés	Artist, sculptor and collector of collections	About his collection theories and life, Museum of Collections	"How is it, How to do it" episode: A Collections' Museum. TVE
1971	Néstor Almendros	Cinematographer and director	On his crafts and career	For the Cinema Magazine produced/presented by Alfonso Eduardo, TVE
1975	Suher Mudsan	PLO representative in Beyruth	Explaining the 1975' Lebanon war different counterparts. Beirut	For "Land" episode of The Rules of the Game, TVE
1975	Nimer Hammad	PLO representative in Rome, Italy	The meaning of "Land" for Palestinians	For "Land" episode of The Rules of the Game, TVE
1975	Hiro Onoda	Japanese military official at the 2nd World War	The Japanese soldier who refused to surrender	For "The War" episode of The Rules of the Game, TVE
1975	Alvaro Cunqueiro	Galician Writer	On the Galician language	For the episode "Language" of the series The Rules of the Game.
1975	Guillermo Cabrera Infante	Cuban writer, Prince of Asturias Award	On the particularities of the Spanish language between Spain and Latin America	For the episode "Language" of the series The Rules of the Game
1975	Camilo José Cela	Spanish writer, Nobel award	On the Spanish language and the academy	For the episode "Language" of the series The Rules of the Game
1975	Salvador de Madariaga	Spanish exiled writer, historian, republican and pacifist, at his house at the Como lake, Switzerland	About being exiled and his memories of Spain (while he continued exiled)	For the episode "The Land" of the series The Rules of the Game
1975	Jack Jones	Union leader, the UK	On the UK official position about Gibraltar/Spain conflict	For the episode "The Land" of the series The Rules of the Game
1975	Sir Alec Douglas-Home	UK Prime Minister	On the UK official position about Gibraltar and Spain	For the episode "The Land" of the series The Rules of the Game
1975	Indira Gandhi	India Prime Minister	On the Indian Independence of UK, at her Palace of government, New Delhi	For the episode "The Land" of the series The Rules of the Game
1976	Santiago Carrillo	Secretary General of the Spanish Communist party in exile,	First secret appearance in Spain after exile	Speech for the first democratic elections in Spain after dictatorship
2014	Dr. Stephanie Seneff	Biologist, Senior Researcher at MIT	On health and nutrition connected to Alzheimer and heart diseases	For "You Must be Nuts, The Business of Dementia", Inner Eye, Prod. UK

== Awards and nominations ==
- 1982 Ondas award (Premio Ondas) for lifetime achievement in TV (Robinson)
- 2005 Golden Medal of the Galician Audiovisual Academy (AGA) to lifetime achievement
