= Galician Writers Association =

Galician Writers Association (Galician: Asociación de Escritores en Lingua Galega, AELG) is an official entity of the autonomous region of Galicia's Xunta (government / board). The organization is formed by writers in galician language. It was founded by a group of writers: Álvaro Cunqueiro, Rafael Dieste, Ánxel Fole, Ricardo Carballo Calero, Antón Avilés de Taramancos, and others. It was named by the Swedish Academy to present candidates to the Nobel Prize and is part of the European Writers Congress.

Every year AELG celebrates "O escritor na súa terra" (Hometown Writers) ceremony dedicated to a Galician language writer trajectory and awards the AELG Prize to the best Galician language work of the year.

At present, Galician Writers Association is placed in a A Coruña, presided by Euloxio Ruibal, and also directed by Carlos Negro, Carlos L. Bernárdez, Marica Campo, Rafa Villar, Marta Dacosta, Rosa Aneiros, Enrique Rabuñal and Cesáreo Sánchez.

== Notable members ==
- Euloxio Ruibal - president
- Carlos Negro - director
- Carlos L. Bernárdez - director
- Marica Campo - director
- Rafa Villar - director
- Marta Dacosta - director
- Rosa Aneiros - director
- Enrique Rabuñal - director
- Cesáreo Sánchez - director
- Rosa Méndez Fonte
- Pilar Pallarés
- Maite Dono
- Manuel María Fernández Teixeiro (1929-2004)
- Constantino "Tino" Rábade Castiñeira - co-founder
- Rafa Villar
- Álvaro Cunqueiro (1911-1981) - co-founder
- Xosé Luís Méndez Ferrín
- Ricardo Carballo Calero (1919-1990) - honorary member
- María Magdalena Domínguez Domínguez (1922-2021)

== "O escritor na súa terra" Award winners ==
The Galician Writers Association highlights those authors who combine literary excellence with the ethical commitment that makes them benchmarks in the defense of national and human dignity, honoring a writer every year.

- 2006 : Mahmoud Darwich
- 2007 : Pepetela
- 2008 : Nancy Morejón
- 2009 : Elena Poniatowska
- 2010: Juan Gelman
- 2011 : Antonio Gamoneda
- 2012 : José Luis Sampedro
- 2013 : Lídia Jorge
- 2014 : Bernardo Atxaga
- 2015 : Luiz Ruffato
- 2016 : Pere Gimferrer
- 2017 : Hélia Correia
- 2018 : Isabel-Clara Simó
- 2019 : María Teresa Horta
- 2020 : Mariasun Landa
- 2021 : José Luandino Vieira
- 2022 : Ana Luísa Amaral
- 2023 : Lydia Cacho

== See also ==
- Royal Galician Academy
