= Nidia Arévalo =

Spanish politician (born 1975)

Member of the Senate
- Incumbent
- Assumed office 23 July 2023
- Constituency: Pontevedra

Personal details
- Born: 25 April 1975 (age 51)
- Party: People's Party

Nidia María Arévalo Gómez (born 25 April 1975) is a Spanish politician serving as a member of the Senate since 2023. She has served as mayor of Mos since 2008.
