= Maite Dono =

Spanish singer-songwriter, poet and actress

- Born: María Teresa Dono Duro; 17 February 1969 (age 57); Vitoria, Spain
- Education: Royal Superior School of Dramatic Art
- Occupations: Singer-songwriter, poet, actress
- Awards: Esquío Poetry Award (2003)

Maite Dono (born 17 February 1969) is a Spanish singer-songwriter, poet, and actress. She is a recipient of the Egoísta International Book Award and the Esquío Poetry Award.

== Biography ==
Maite Dono studied Philology at the University of Santiago de Compostela and graduated in Acting at the Royal Superior School of Dramatic Art (RESAD) in Madrid.

In 1993, she began her theatrical activity as an actress. In 1998, she began her musical career with her first solo album: Corazón de Brief, in homage to the folk singer-songwriter Emilio Cao, in which she sang his works accompanied only by the piano of Manuel Gutiérrez. Dono's second album, titled O mar vertical (2001), was more personal and included her own songs. The work was accompanied by a book of poems of the same name. She also participated in the Cantigas de Nadal compilation CD. She has collaborated on projects with different artists from the Galician scene: jazz, accompanying Baldo Martínez and pianist Alberto Conde, performing medieval cantigas with Carlos Beceiro, and works with Roberto Somoza. She has also participated in musical works by Na Lúa and La Musgaña.

Since 2006, Dono has experimented poetically and musically with Intruso. Her latest contributions to music were in the Miño Project, from bassist Baldo Martínez, and a duet with Martínez on Sons Nús. In 2013, she participated as an actress in the play Hamlet post scriptum, directed by Roberto García de Mesa. She has written stories and theatrical works. She has several unpublished books, among which Poemas da Mamachán ou de cómo podrecen os fardos (in Galician) stands out. Her poems have been part of various anthologies and collective books. She has published in magazines such as Salamandria, El Planeta, Madrygal, and Mester de Vandalía. She resides in Santiago de Compostela.

== Works ==
=== Music ===
- 1998: Corazón de brief
- 2001: O mar vertical
- 2010: Sons nús, with Baldo Martínez

=== Poetry ===
- 1996: Manta de sombra (in Spanish). Libertarias/Prodhufi.
- 2000: O mar vertical (in Galician). Espiral Maior. ISBN 9788495625106.
- 2004: Desilencios v. Sociedade de Cultura Valle-Inclán.
- 2009: Circus girl (in Spanish). El Gaviero. ISBN 9788493661717
- 2013: Sobras (in Spanish). El Gaviero.

=== Collective works ===
- 2011: Tamén navegar (in Galician), Toxosoutos.

== Awards and recognitions ==
- 1995: 1st Egoísta International Book Award, for Manta de sombra
- 2003: 23rd Esquío Poetry Award, for Desilencios
