= Mos, Spain =

Concello de Mos
- Municipality
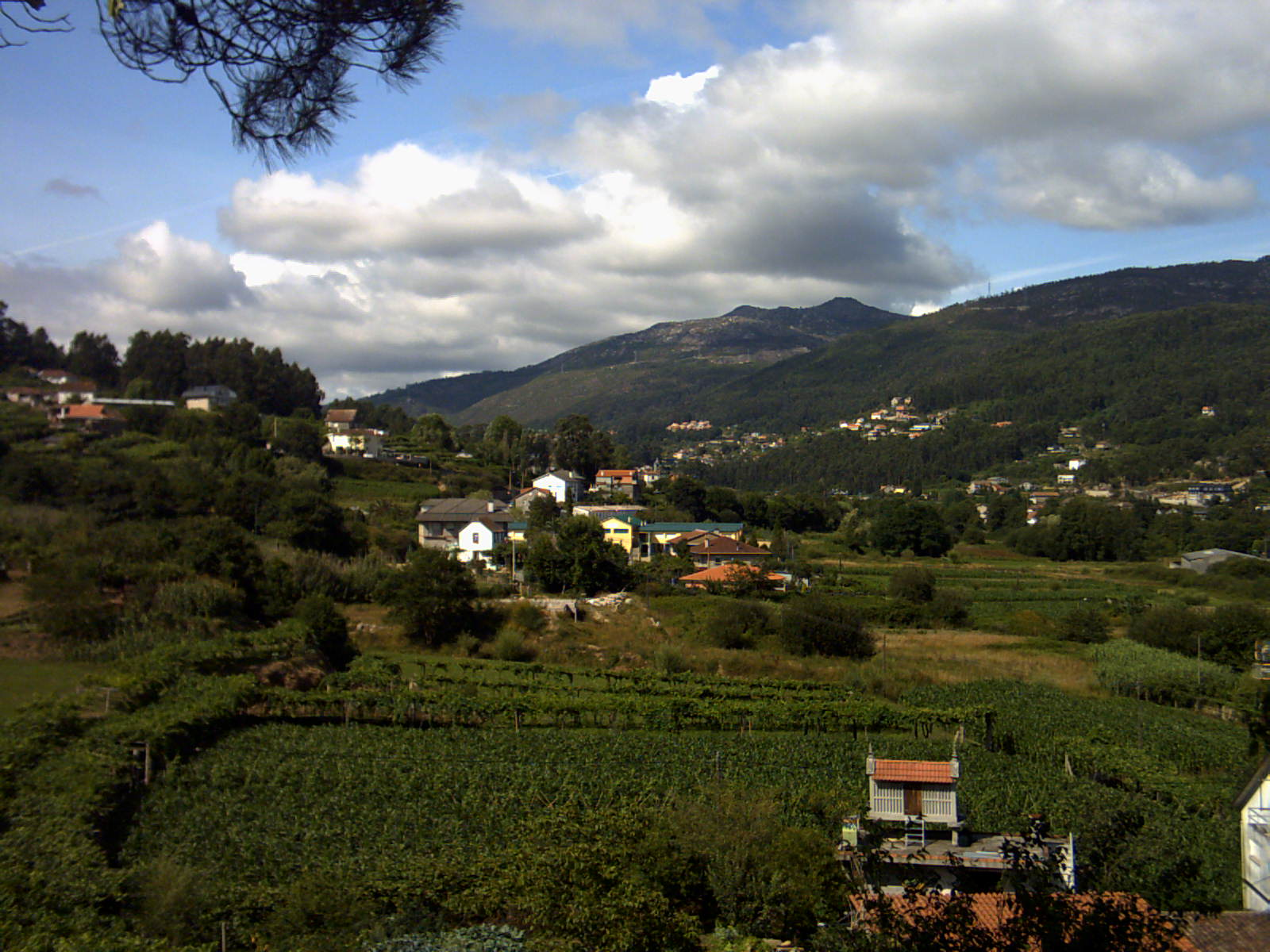

- Flag Coat of arms

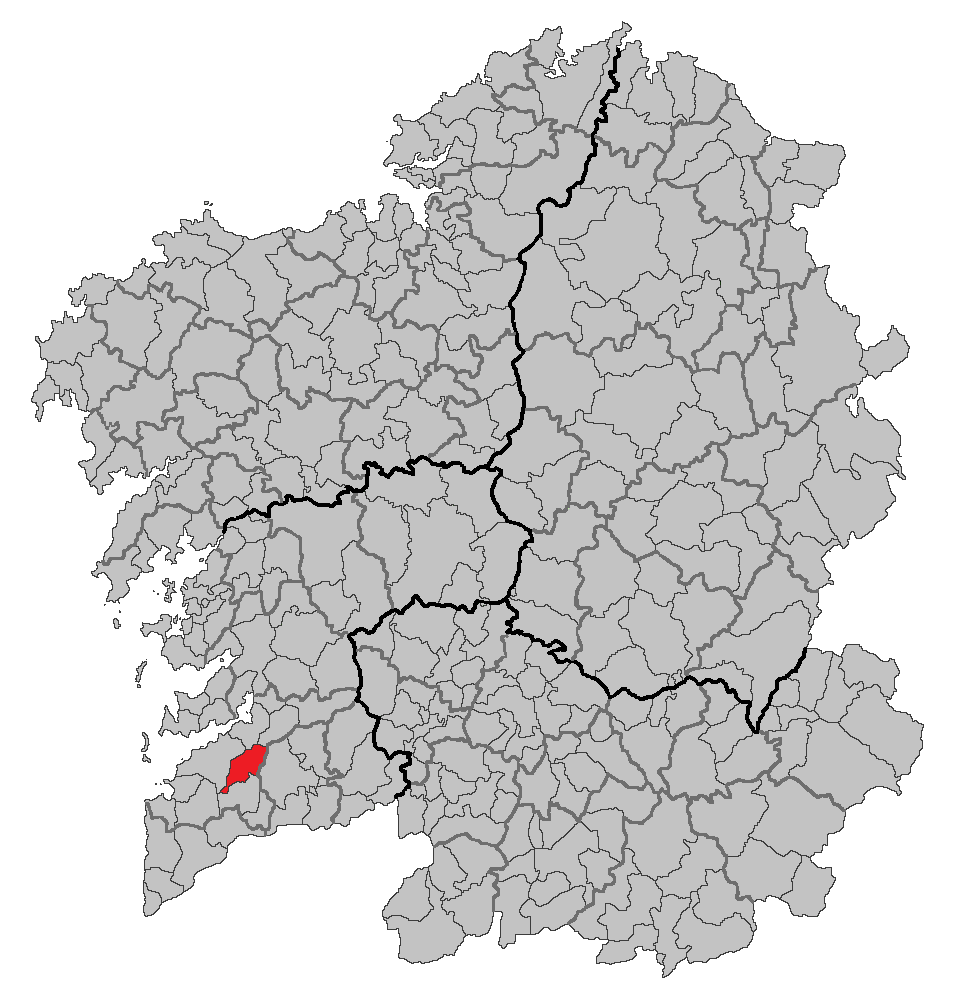
- Situation of Mos within Galicia
- Coordinates: 42°13′N 8°36′W
- Parroquias: Tameiga, Sanguiñeda, Pereiras, Cela, Louredo, Guizán, Dornelas, Petelos, Torroso and Mos

Government
  - Alcalde (Mayor): Nidia Arévalo (PPdeG)

Population (2025-01-01)
  - Total: 15,233
- (INE)
- Time zone: UTC+1 (CET)
  - Summer (DST): UTC+2 (CET)

Mos is a municipality in the province of Pontevedra in Galicia, Spain. Mos is adjacent to Vigo.

The Louro River flows through Mos from north to south, making the municipality a valley region.

There is no significant urban nucleus and most of the population live scattered across the municipality. Family-owned farms and vineyards are very common.

== Weather ==
The key feature of the climate of Mos is the existence of two very different microclimates, a mountain and a valley, represented near Comber and O Porriño, respectively. The average temperature is 14.05 °C.

== Education ==
Mos has a high school, the IES de Mos.

Mos is home to the O Castro British School, which starts from nursery through to KS4.

== Economy ==
Mos has a strong industry, and because of its geographical position between Vigo and the Portuguese border, it is crossed by many transport infrastructures. Recently, the announcement of the construction of a high-speed railway track and a new highway has resulted in numerous demonstrations and protests.

== Government ==
Since December 2008, the municipality has been governed by Nidia Arévalo, former People's Party councilor after a vote of no confidence.

== Communications ==
Four major roads cross southern Galicia Mos: the N-550 (Tui - A Coruña), AP-9 (Atlantic Highway), the A-52 (Vigo, Ourense) and A-55 (Vigo-Portugal).

Vigo Airport (VGO) is partially in the boundaries of Mos.

== Notable people ==
- María Magdalena Domínguez (1922-2021), poet

== See also ==
- List of municipalities in Pontevedra
