= Constantino Rábade =

Galician actor and playwright

Tino Rábade
- Born: March 14, 1956 (age 70); Betanzos, Galicia, Spain
- Occupations: Actor, playwright, scriptwriter
- Writing career
- Language: Galician

Constantino "Tino" Rábade Castiñeira (born March 14, 1956) is a Galician actor and playwright. He is also founding member of the Galician Writers Association and the Galician Ecologist Movement, a political party established in 1983.

== Works ==
- Lenda antiga dun home que quererá voar (1979)
- A historia xamáis contada de Brancaneves e o Rei Artur (1998)

== Awards ==
- I Prémio de Teatro Breve da Escola Dramática Galega
- Mención Honorífica no VIII Concurso Nacional de Teatro Infantil O Facho
