= Pilar Pallarés =

Pilar Pallarés García
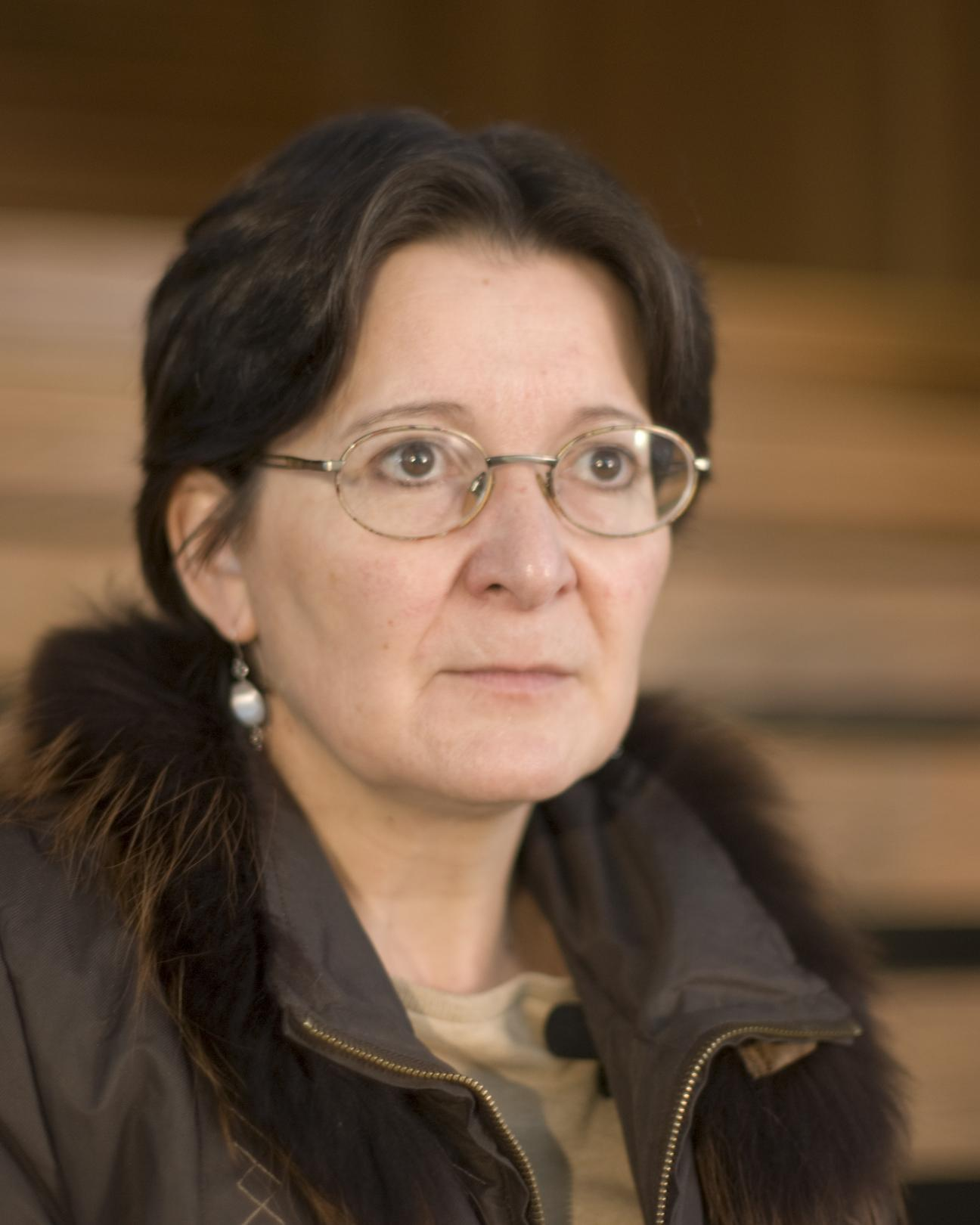
- Born: 29 April 1957 (age 68); Culleredo, A Coruña, Spain
- Education: University of Santiago de Compostela
- Occupations: Poet and writer

Pilar Pallarés García (born 29 April 1957) is a Galician poet. She won the National Poetry Award, a prize awarded annually by the Ministry of Culture of Spain, in 2019 for her book of poems Tempo fósil; English translation: Fossil Time.

== Biography ==
Pallarés studied Portuguese and Galician Philology at the University of Santiago de Compostela.

She has collaborated with various magazines, such as Grial, Coordenadas, Dorna, Noreste and Fiesta de la Palabra Silenciada. After the publication of her first book, Entre lusco e fusco, in 1979, she became one of the most important voices in Galician poetry. She later published the works Sétima soidade, which won the Premio Esquío poetry award, and Livro das devoracións. She is currently a professor of Galician literature at the Instituto Ramón Menéndez Pidal de A Coruña.

Pallarés won the National Poetry Award in 2019, becoming the third Galician-language author to win the award. In Tempo fósil, the book of poems for which she won the award, she explores themes of loss and destruction, as well as current issues such as climate change and the plight of refugees.

== Awards ==
- 1979 - Winner of the Poesía Nova do Facho award
- 1983 - Winner of the Premio Esquío de poesía award, for Sétima soidade
- 2012 - Winner of the Galician Writers Association poetry award, for Leopardo son
- 2019 - Winner of the National Poetry Award, for Tempo fósil

== Major works ==
- Entre lusco e fusco; English translation: Between Gloom and Doom (1979)
- Sétima soidade (1983)
- Livro das devoracións (1996)
- Poemas (2000)
- Leopardo son (2011)
- Tempo fósil (2018)
- Contra humana parte (2025).
