= Premio Eusebio Lorenzo Baleirón =

Poetry prize in Spain

The poetry prize Premio Eusebio Lorenzo Baleirón was created in 1988 by the city of Dodro, Spain, with the objective of contributing to the reaffirmation of Galician poetry and to honor the poet Eusebio Lorenzo Baleirón. The winning poems have been published, since 1992, are published in a book titled Colección de poesía Eusebio Lorenzo Baleirón, which is released by Edicións do Castro.

== Winners ==
- 2014: Ramón Neto, Zonas de Tránsito.
- 2013: Cristina Ferreiro Real, As paisaxes eléctricas.
- 2012: Serxio Iglesias, Viaxe ao interior da fenda.
- 2011: Isaac Xubín, Con gume de folla húmida
- 2010: Luís Valle Regueiro, Fedor
- 2009: Xosé Daniel Costas Currás, Conservas
- 2008: Xabier Xil Xardón, Cando menos, a derrota
- 2007: Nieves Soutelo, Código poético
- 2006: Rafa Villar, Escoración dos días
- 2005: Mariña Pérez Rei, Fanerógama
- 2004: Lupe Gómez, Azul estranxeira
- 2003: María Comesaña Besteiros, Zoonose
- 2002: Eduardo Estévez, Caderno apócrifo da pequena defunta
- 2001: Xosé Lois Rúa, O tránsito da auga
- 2000: Carlos Penela, Acaso o inverno
- 1999: Emma Pedreira, Grimorio
- 1998: Estevo Creus, Teoría do lugar
- 1997: Emma Couceiro, As entrañas horas
- 1996: Isidro Novo, Dende unha nada núa
- 1995: Xosé Miranda, Amantes e viaxeiros
- 1994: Xosé M. Millán Picouto, As palabras no espello
- 1993: Xabier Cordal, Fruto do teixo
- 1992: Palmira González Boullosa, Asoladamente, o teu nome
- 1991: Helena Villar Janeiro, Nas hedras da clepsidra
- 1990: Xavier Rodríguez Barrio, Alborada no muro
- 1989: Gonzalo Navaza, Fábrica íntima
- 1988: Xosé López Gómez, O matiz esmeralda na sombra
