= María Magdalena Domínguez =

Spanish poet (1922–2021)

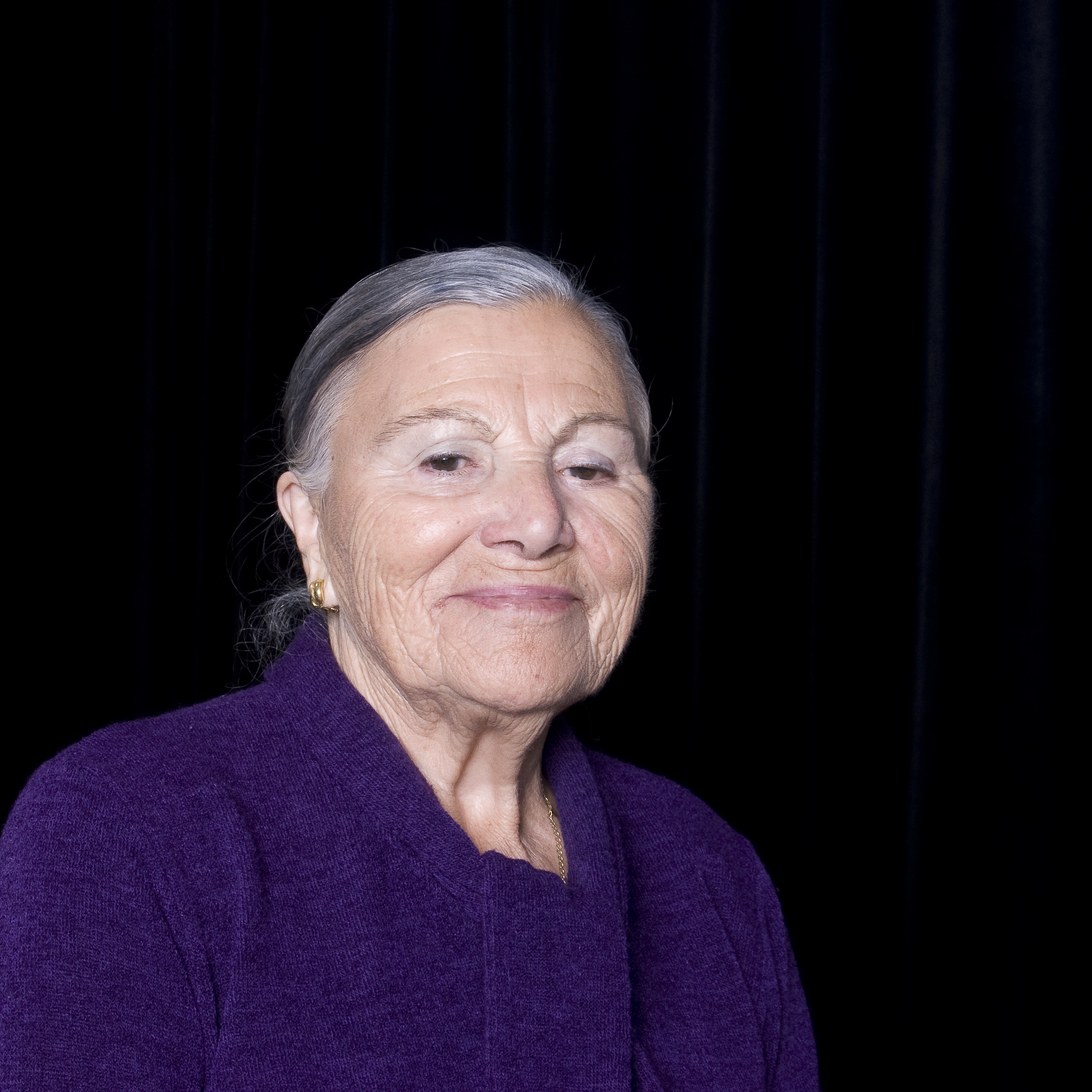
María Magdalena Domínguez Domínguez (2010)

María Magdalena Domínguez Domínguez (11 July 1922 - 18 August 2021) was a Spanish poet of Galicia.

== Biography ==
María Magdalena Domínguez Domínguez was born in the village of Mos, Province of Pontevedra, 11 July 1922. From a young age, she was fond of reading, especially poetry and she always had a great desire to learn. Her mother taught her to read and write in Galician, and also how to speak Spanish before she started school.

While still in school, Domínguez was inspired by the writings of Rosalía de Castro, as well as Alfonso Daniel Rodríguez Castelao, and Álvaro Cunqueiro among others. She started writing poetry and for years, no one around her knew about it. She dedicated many of her poems to her husband, including "Alborada do Val da Louriña", which she published 30 years later, in 1986.

In 2016, the City Council of Mos paid tribute to her for her 94th birthday, recognizing her merit as one of the three best self-taught Galician poets.

Domínguez died 18 August 2021. The city of Mos will name its new library in her honor.

== Selected works ==
=== Poetry in Galician ===
- Alborada do Val da Louriña, 1986.
- Colleita de soños tristes, 1990.
- Alborada do Val da Louriña, 1992.
- Retrancas, 1993.
- Sementeira de soños, 1994.
- Amores na lúa, 1998.
- Tempos de chorar, 2001.
- ¿A quen lle dou unha estrela?, 2005.
- Alma de can, 2009.

=== Children's literature in Galician ===
- O baúl das lembranzas: poemas para nenos, 2005.

=== Poetry in Spanish ===
- Un nuevo amanecer, 1991.
- Como él manantial, 1993.
- Mariposas de invierno, 1994.
- En el doblaron lanas campanas, 1998.
- Sueños de cristal, 2001.
- Golondrinas en él cielo, 2005.
