= Antón Lamazares =

Spanish painter (born 1954)

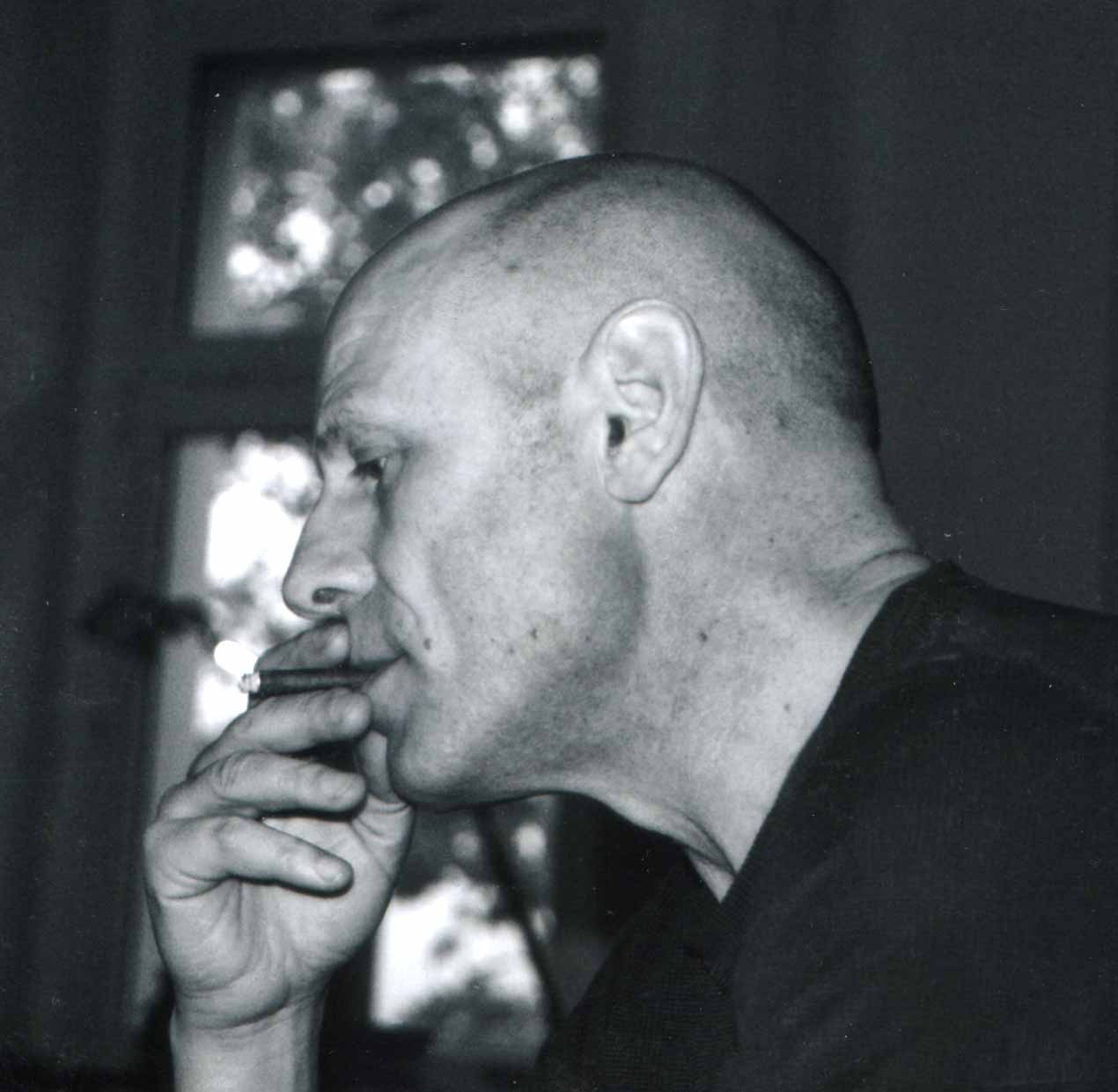
Lamazares in Berlin, 2005

Antón Lamazares (born 1954) is a Spanish painter, who is, along with José María Sicilia, Miquel Barceló and Víctor Mira, a member of the "generación de los 80". Working elaborate surfaces of wood and cardboard with varnish and other materials, he has created a very personal medium and artistic language. From an initially playful expressionism, his style has developed toward abstract expressionism and straightforward abstraction, and, more recently, a sort of minimalism in which an intimate dialogue between soul and memory, the spiritual and the sensual, poetry and dream-life can take place. His works have been exhibited throughout the world and are held by numerous important institutions, including the National Museum Reina Sofía, the Galician Centre for Contemporary Art, the Madrid Museum of Contemporary Art and the Marugame Hirai Museum of Japan, as well as by many private collectors and foundations.

== Biography ==
=== Early years: painting and poetry ===
(Galicia, 1954–1977)

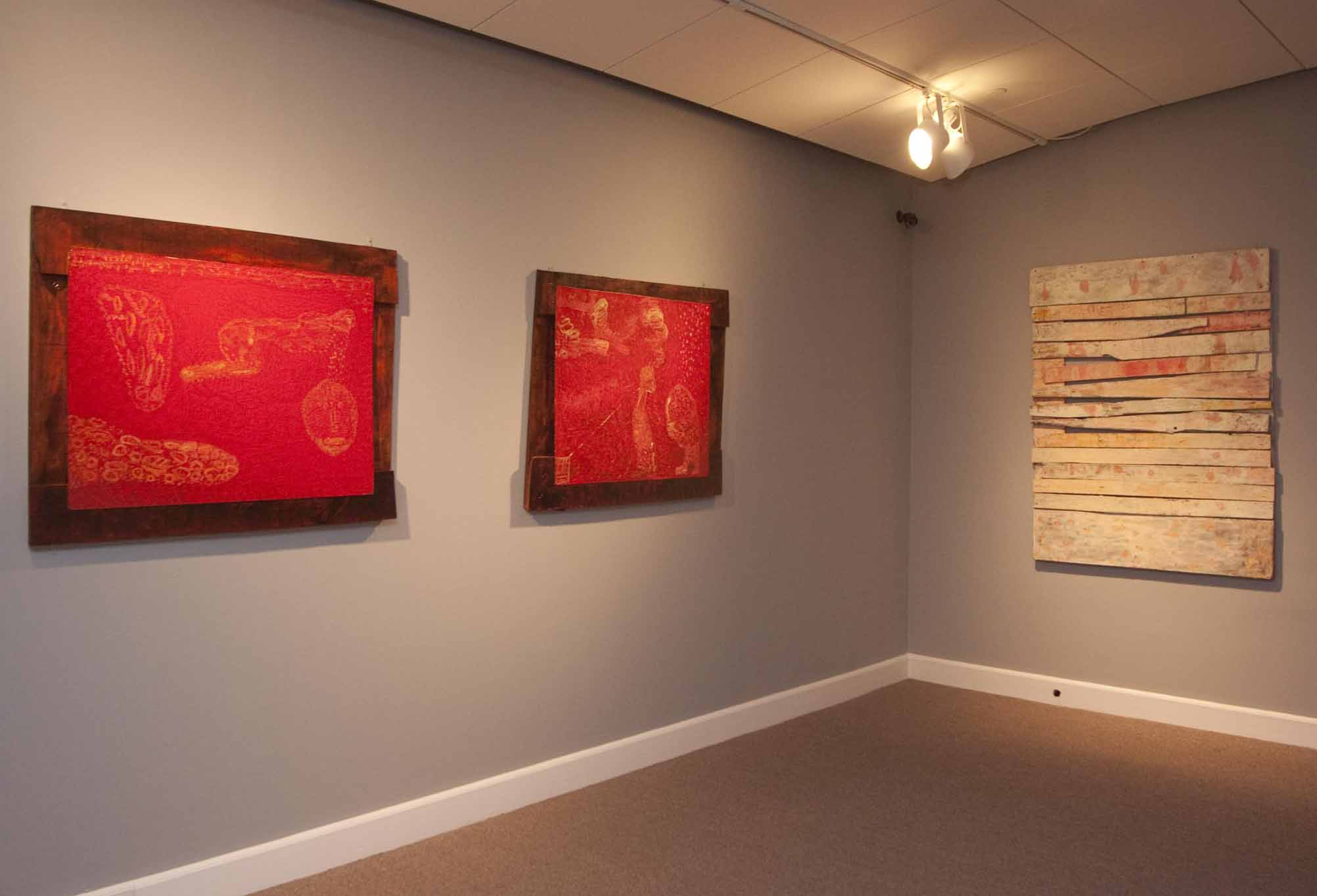
Pieces from the series Sueño e colorao and Titania e Brao

Lamazares was born on 2 January 1954 in Maceira, a village in Lalín (Pontevedra, Spain), whose rural environment left a deep impact on his imagery and creative process. Much of his early schooling (1963–1969) took place at the Franciscan seminary of Herbón where he devoted himself to the study of literature, mostly Latin and Greek classics. In the late 1960s he began writing poetry and developed friendships with the writer Álvaro Cunqueiro and the painters Laxeiro and Manuel Pesqueira, who would become formative influences. As his creative vocation began to shift from poetry toward painting, he undertook lengthy travels throughout Europe (1972) to study in person work by the masters he revered, including, Paul Klee, Rembrandt and Joan Miró, to whom would be added Antoni Tàpies, Manuel Millares, Alberto Giacometti and Francis Bacon, as well as Medieval art and the Art of Oceania.

At the conclusion of his travels he stayed briefly in Barcelona, where he took a job as a construction worker, studying the works in its museums, particularly the collections of Romanesque art at the Marés Museum and the National Art Museum of Catalonia in his free time. In Madrid, where he next alighted, he resumed contact with his maestro, Laxeiro, and got to know the poet Carlos Oroza, whose friendship would remain essential for him: the dialogue between painting and poetry is a constant in all of his work.

In 1973, at the age of only 19, Lamazares had already begun exhibiting his paintings in group and solo shows. In 1975 he began his compulsory military service in the Navy, in Ferrol. On September 27 of that year he learned the startling news of the final executions by the Franco regime, following the Burgos Trial; one of the executed culprits was his friend Humberto Baena, a 24-year-old from Pontevedra. The news sank Lamazares into a deep depression, resulting in a period of psychiatric institutionalization. It was during this time that he would write his collection of poems, Adibal.

"Throughout the 20th century painters have wanted to express the most hidden and mysterious places of the human being. But when they did so, it has always been on a white canvas, as if they had the ability to express themselves over the immaculate territory of nothingness. For me a painter isn't someone who demonstrates his power over a surface, but one who succeeds in establishing a relationship of conflict and of respect with the world that surrounds him. When I take up a piece of cardboard or wood and paint on it, I do so because I believe that I am thereby calling to mind the importance of a sacred dimension."

— Lamazares, Enter.arte, 2007

=== From expressionism and Arte Povera to bifacial painting ===
(Madrid-New York, 1978–1989)

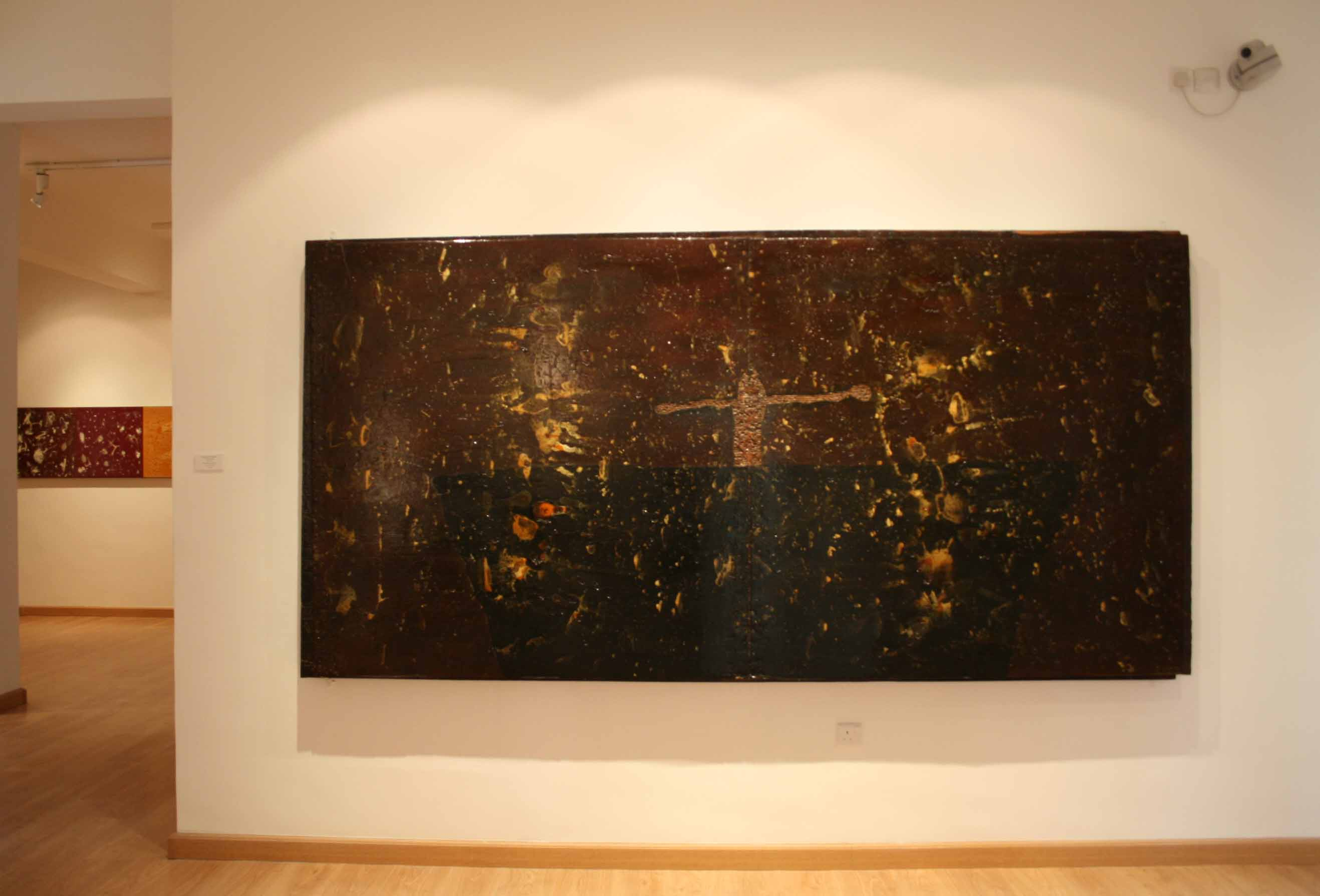
Mauro, from Gracias vagabundas, in the National Gallery of Jordan

In 1978 Lamazares moved to Madrid, where he formed a close friendship with the painter Alfonso Fraile, as well as with the gallerist Juana Mordó, the art critic and poet Santiago Amón and the neurologist Alberto Portera, the link to a large group of artists –writers, filmmakers, musicians and painters– who would meet on weekends at his country house in Mataborricos, where Lamazares would mount an open-air exhibition of his work in 1979. That same year he would meet Joan Miró, and travel through Provence to acquaint himself with the landscape of Van Gogh, Picasso, Cézanne or Matisse.

The 1980s were a time of intense creative activity and broad diffusion of his work: by the age of 30, Lamazares had already carved out a space in the panorama of Spanish as well as international art. His paintings of the time show playful and dreamlike figures depicted in an expressionistic mode, intensely chromatic and powerfully original. He exhibited at Juana Mordó's gallery in Madrid, at Elisabeth Frank's in Belgium and at the Sala Gaspar in Barcelona. Soon he moved to New York City, where he would remain for two years on a Fulbright Scholarship. There, his painting, which he exhibited at the Bruno Fachetti Gallery, developed in a direction at once purer and more material. For a period he divided his time between New York and Salamanca. In 1988 he traveled through Anatolia –visiting the temple of Didyma as a tribute to Hölderlin's Hyperion– and Istanbul, where he was deeply impressed by the Byzantine churches. Imagery reflecting his experience, articulated by the arrangement of wood in the paintings, can be seen in the work exhibited at Galería Miguel Marcos. In 1990 he began preparing a new series of works, designed to be looked at from both sides, which he calls bifrontes (bifacials).

"The myth proposed and given form by Antón Lamazares in the equidistance of the twilight isn't about crossing the border of another world, but about identifying and revealing a profound sense of infinity of the one here. As the true artist he is, Lamazares becomes a witness to the dimension of the infinite. Only the great artists have been able to evoke that dimension and transform it into myth."

— Santiago Amón, La pintura de Lamazares y la luz crepuscular, 1986

=== Sculptural painting and large formats ===
(Paris-Madrid, 1990–2003)

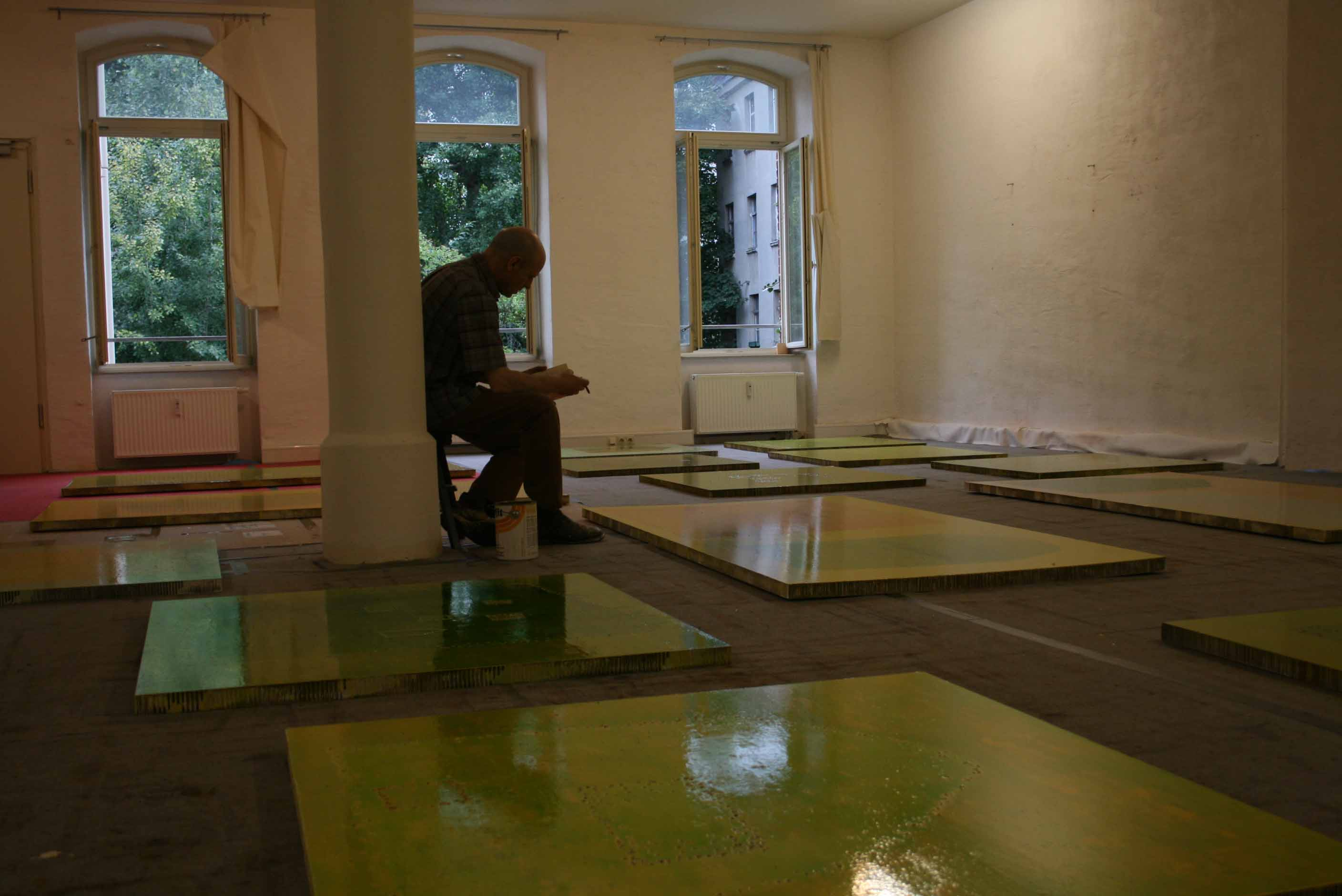
Antón Lamazares in his studio

In 1990 and 1991, Lamazares came to Paris on a stipend from the Cité des Arts, and in 1991 he opened a large studio in Madrid, where he began to work on the series Gracias vagabundas (Wandering Graces) and Desazón de vagabundos (The Anxiety of Vagabonds). In 1993 he met Tàpies and published an extensive interview with him subsequent to Tàpies having been awarded the Golden Lion at the Venice Biennale. Invited by the Galician Centre for Contemporary Art, he spent May to November 1996 in Galicia painting the series Gracias do lugar: Eidos de Rosalía, Eidos de Bama (The place's charm: Rosalía's fields, Bama’s fields). From June to November 1997 he worked outdoors in Santa Baia de Matalobos on Bés de Santa Baia. That same year he became acquainted with the sculptor Jorge Oteiza, a lengthy conversation with whom is filmed by Chus Gutiérrez. In 1998, in Madrid, he painted the series Titania e Brao, a tribute to the Castilian summer, and subsequently Pol en Adelán.

During this time, he also created numerous graphic works, including a suite of etchings to accompany five texts by Gustavo Martín Garzo in the artist's book El Canto de la Cabeza (Galería Sen, Madrid) and the lithographs that accompany Itinerarium by Egeria (Raiña Lupa, Paris), a work that was nominated as book of the year by Le Monde Diplomatique. In 2001 he mounted a grand-scale exhibition at the Seaport of A Coruña, under the title Un saco de pan duro (A Bag of Hard Bread).

His work was chosen for international promotion, along with that of other Spanish artists such as Antonio Saura, Martín Chirino, Joan Hernández Pijuan, Millares, Pablo Serrano, Oteiza and Tàpies by the Ministry of Foreign Affairs under its program Spanish Art for the Outside World. Around this time Lamazares traveled to Florence and Assisi to examine works of Renaissance art as well as to gain familiarity with the milieu of Saint Francis, to whom he would dedicate his new series, Follente Bemil.

"His work has often been compared with that of Jean Dubuffet, or Gaston Chaissac and his idea of the brut, the spontaneous, but in truth, he has always been in search of that humble beauty which is constantly threatened by the strong winds of reality and of conformity."

— Gustavo Martín Garzo, Jonás y la calabacera, 2000

=== From abstraction to poetic minimalism ===
(Berlin, since 2004)

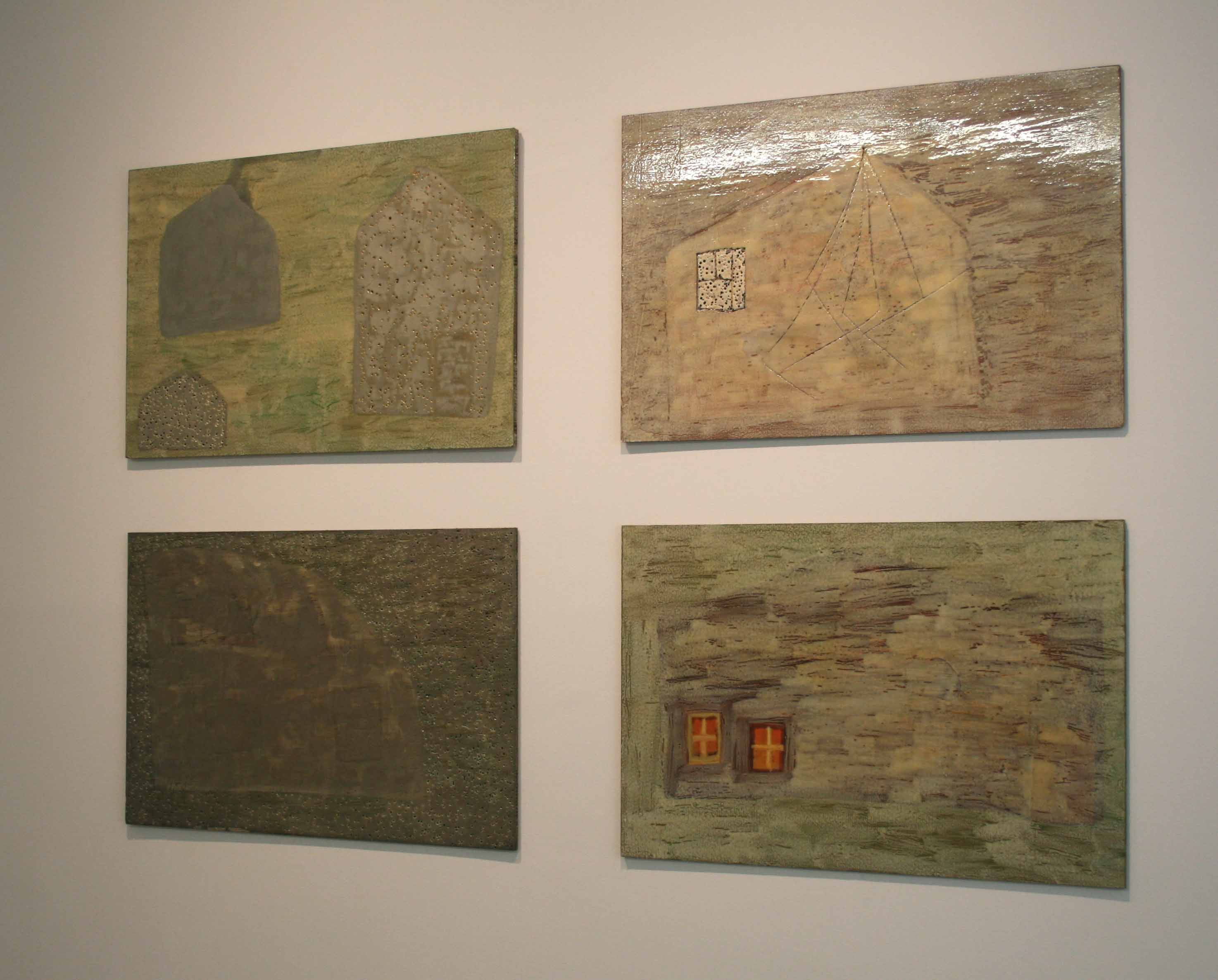
Exhibition of Domus Omnia in Santiago de Compostela

In 2004, Lamazares moved to Berlin, where he has been living ever since. Following the death of his father he began the series E fai frío no lume (It’s Cold in the Fire). He was the subject of large exhibitions in Slovenia and in the Museum (Church) Kiscelli in Budapest (Hungary).

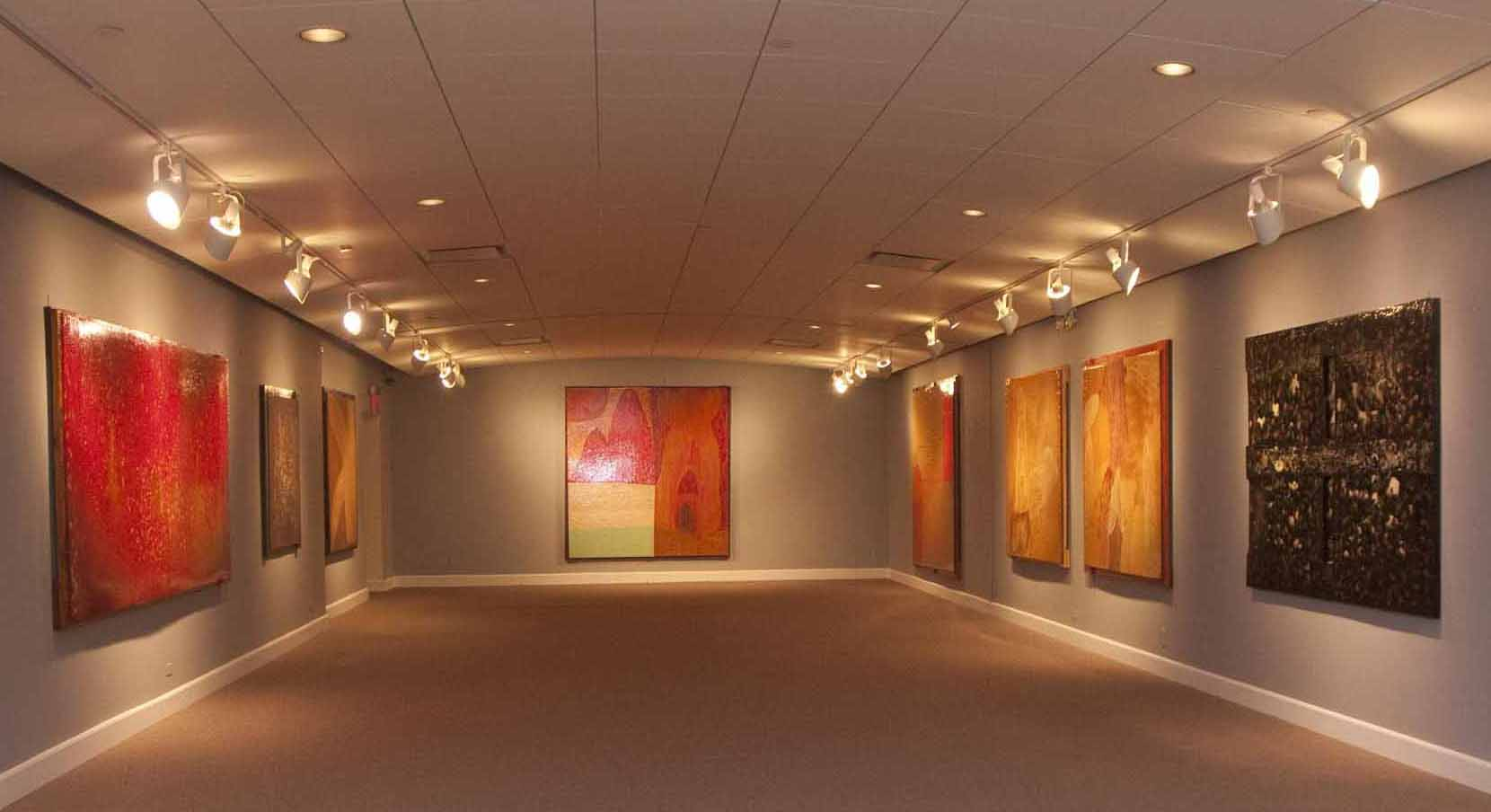
Exhibition by Lamazares in New York, 2009

Subsequently he devoted himself to the series Domus Omnia, and collaborated in the creation of two further artist's books by Oroza: Deseo sin trámite (Aguatinta, Vigo) with a serigraph and Un sentimiento ingrávido recorre el ambiente (Raiña Lupa, Paris) to which he contributed five lithographs.

In 2008 he exhibited Horizonte sin dueño (Unowned Horizon) in the National Gallery of Jordan (Amman) and an anthology of his graphic work in the Cervantes Institute of Damascus (Syria), where the poet Taher Riyad dedicated the collection of poems Cantos de Lamazares to him. In 2009 he exhibited his work at the Queen Sofía Spanish Institute in New York, as well as in Ourense (Spain), at the Cultural Centre of the Delegation. He also participated in a traveling exhibition dedicated to the poet Vicente Aleixandre and received the Laxeiro Prize honoring his life's work and its international renown. In 2010 he exhibited his work at the University Church, in Santiago de Compostela, and in Tui, where the documentary Horizonte sin dueño, was screened at its international film festival Play-Doc. The film, directed by the siblings Nayra and Javier Sanz (Rinoceronte Films), presents a journey through the universe of painting, poetry and nature from the perspective of Antón Lamazares.

"Antón Lamazares has always manifested a brutal affection for, so to speak, "innocent" material and gesture, which isn't exactly the same as "spontaneous". One shouldn't forget that Lamazares is an intellectually and technically very complex artist. For example, he can use a base as vulgar as cardboard, but in his hands, well-pressed and varnished, it acquires the luster of polished wood. His "scribbles", which mimic the carelessness of children or the rudimentary schematism of self-taught artists, are impregnated, no matter what the figurative motif is, with subtle refinements."

— Francisco Calvo Serraller, Casa de la pintura, 2007

On 20 May 2010 the University of Santiago de Compostela awarded him its Insignia de Oro (Golden Shield). This was the first time in six centuries that this honor was conferred upon an artist. On 28 June 2010, during a ceremony held at the Igrexa de San Domingos de Bonaval, the Xunta de Galicia, conferred upon him the Medalla Castelao, acknowledging "the perfection, the symbolism and the transcendency of the works" as a reflection of the devotion to and faith "in the culture, the history and the essence of a people."

== See also ==
- Abstract art
- Expressionism
- Minimalism
- Contemporary art
- List of Spanish painters
