= Galician Ecologist Movement =

Galician Ecologist Movement Movimento Ecoloxista Galego
- President: Constantino Rábade
- Founded: 1983
- Headquarters: A Corunha, Galiza
- Ideology: Ecologism; Green politics Galician nationalism

The Galician Ecologist Movement (Galician: Movimento Ecoloxista Galego), also known as MEG, is an inactive Galician political party founded in 1983 by Constantino Rábade. The party was the first environmentalist political organization created in Galicia and run in several local elections. In 2011 it was incorporated into the Land Party.

== See also ==
- Environmentalism
- Green politics
