= Rosa Méndez Fonte =

Galician researcher and poet (b. 1957)

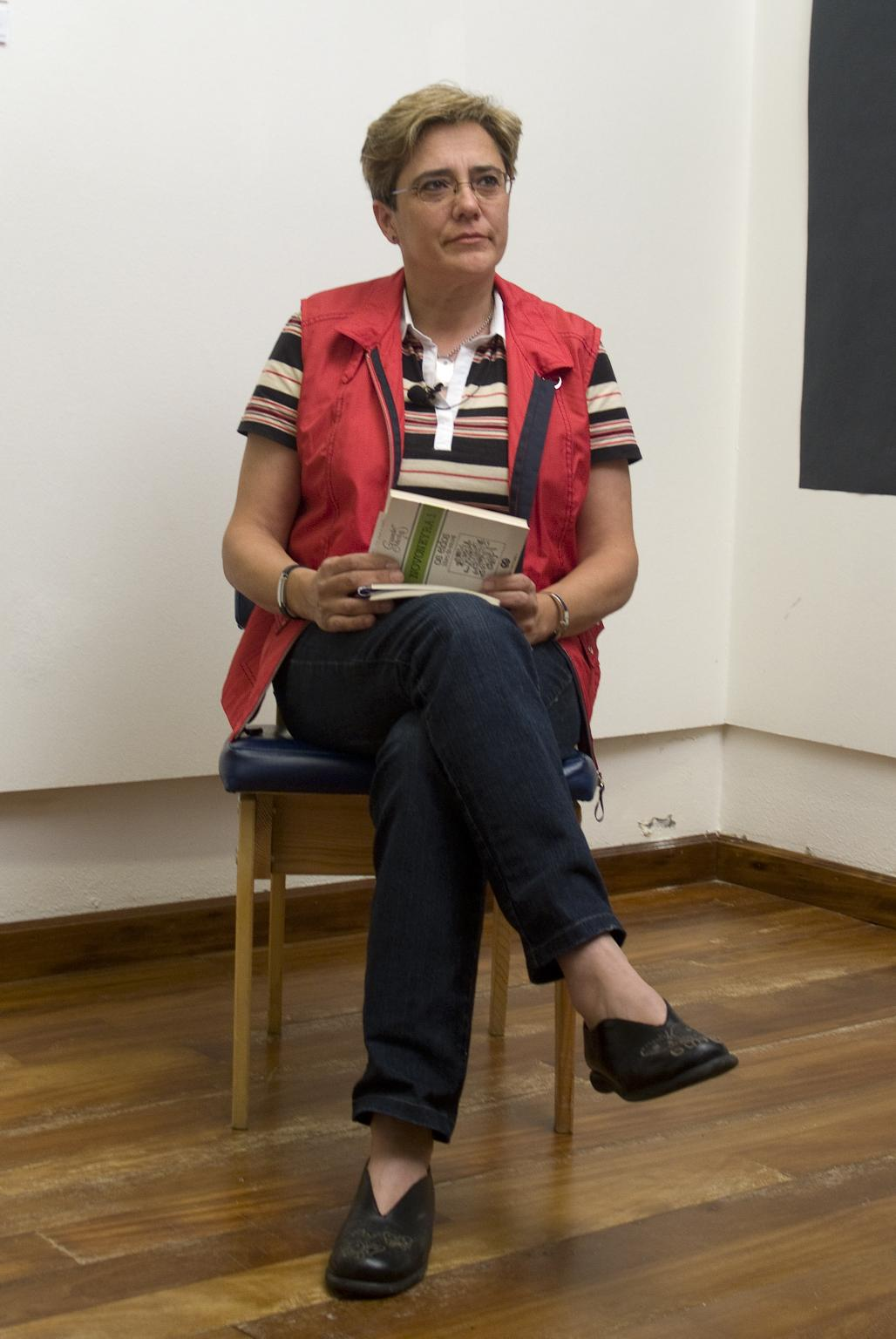
- Rosa Méndez Fonte by Santos Díez & Eduardo Castro Bal, 2007
- Born: 1957 (age 68–69); Ferrol, Spain
- Education: PhD in Humanities
- Occupations: Writer, researcher

Rosa Méndez Fonte (born 1957 in Ferrol, Spain), is a Galician writer, poet, and researcher in both Galician and Spanish.

== Career ==
Méndez has a PhD in Humanities and is a specialist in Galician Heritage and Society from the University of A Coruña. She currently works as a researcher of Galician history at the Fernando Pessoa University in Porto, Portugal.

She is a member of the Galician Writers Association.

== Works in Galician ==
=== Poetry ===
- Poemas anobelados no tempo, 2001, Espiral Maior.
- O raio verde, 2005, Espiral Maior

=== Essays ===
- A antiga igrexa parroquial de San Xulián de Ferrol, 2000, Centro Ártabro de Estudios.
- Ferrol. Patrimonio e Sociedade, 2010, Sociedad de Cultura Valle-Inclán

=== Collective works ===
- Poesía na noite, 1998, Caldas de Reis Town Hall.
- O patrimonio e a cultura proxectual, 2000, Provincial Council of Lugo, with Xosé Leira López. Essay
- A cidade como pretexto. Estratexias patrimoniais, 2002. Provincial Council of Lugo, with Xosé Leira López. Essay
- Alma de beiramar, 2002, Galician Writers Association. Poetry
- Negra sombra. Intervención poética contra a marea negra, 2003, Espiral Maior. Poetry
- A Coruña á luz das letras, 2008, Trifolium. Poetry
- Vivir un soño repetido. Homenaxe a Lois Pereiro, 2011, Galician Writers Association, ebook; Poetry
- A cidade na poesía galega do século XXI, 2012, Editorial Toxosoutos. Poetry
- 150 Cantares para Rosalía de Castro (2015, ebook). Poetry

== Works in Spanish ==
=== Short story ===
- De un tiempo atrás, 1990
- Las horas guardan sombras, 1993

=== Essay ===
- La conservación de los monumentos arquitectónicos en Galicia (1840-1940), 2010, Edicións Embora.

=== Awards in Spanish ===
- Galiena do Concello de Toledo Award in 1993, for Las horas guardan sombras.
- VI Premio Concepción Arenal de Humanidades, for La conservación de los monumentos arquitectónicos en Galicia (1840-1940)

=== Academic publications (selected) ===
- Fonte, Rosa Méndez. "Las vías romanas en Galicia: Un elemento configurador del patrimonio." Aulas no camiño: un estudio multidisciplinar da realidade galega que atravesan os camiños de Santiago. O Camiño Francés. Servizo de Publicacións, 1996.
- Fonte, Rosa Méndez. "Dinámica y construcción social del patrimonio." Antropológicas (1998): 99–103.
- Méndez Fonte, Rosa. "Siglo XIX, o el nacimiento de una nueva mentalidad patrimonial: una visión a través de la legislación jurídica del Camino de Santiago." (1999).

== See also ==
- Galician-language literature
