= Rafa Villar =

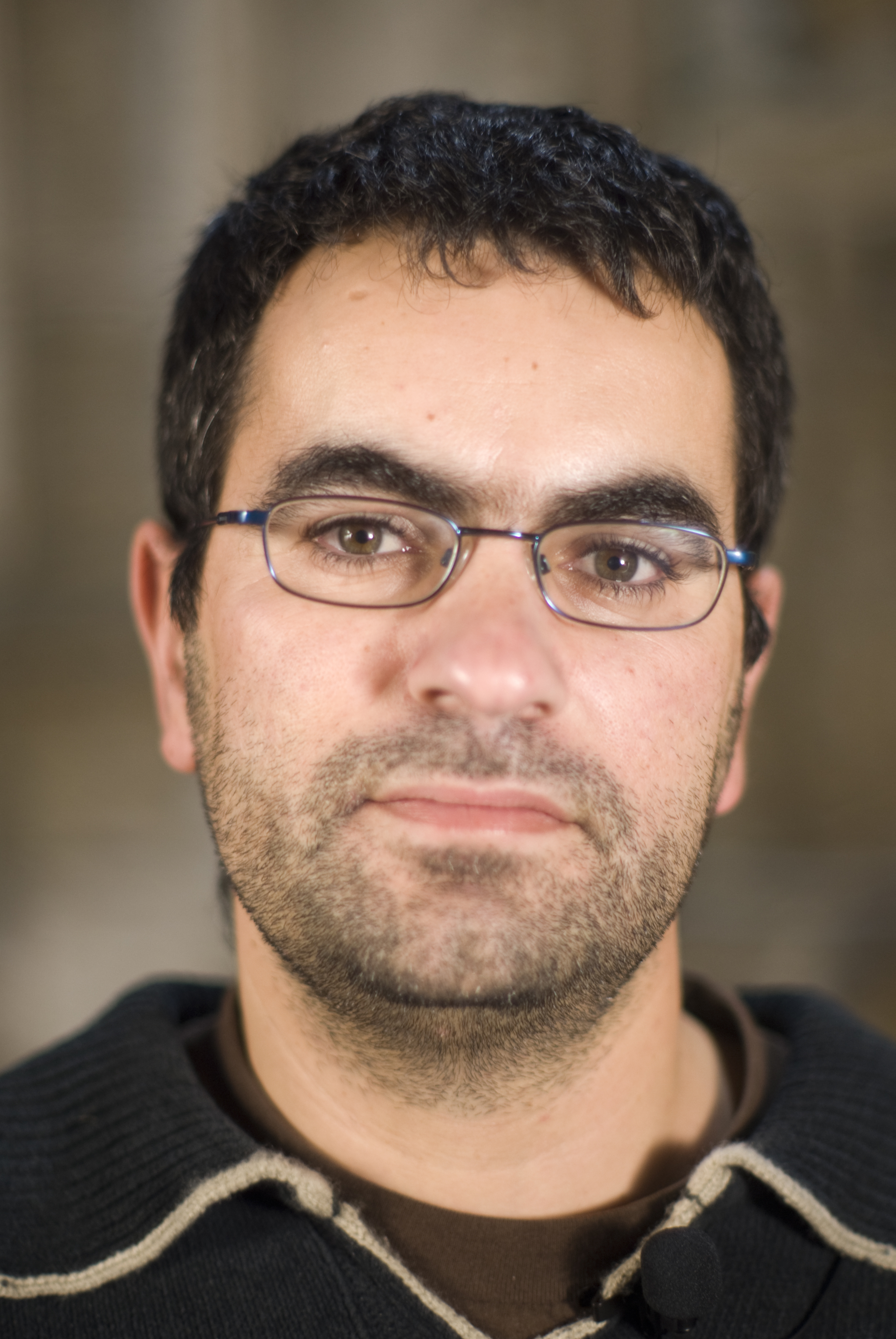
Rafa Villar

Rafa Villar (Cee, Galicia, 1968 - ) is a Galician writer noted especially in the field of poetry. He has a degree in Galician-Portuguese Philology from the Universidade de Santiago de Compostela, and works in the linguistic normalization service of the Confederación Intersindical Galega. He was spokesman for the national operator of the Plataforma Nunca Máis and part of the directive of the Galician Writers Association. He is a member of the Batallón Literario da Costa da Morte and was also one of the founders and promoters of the publishing firm Letras de Cal.

He began to become known in the year 1991, when he won the Premio Fermín Bouza Brey for new authors with Liques da Memoria.

He is interested in alternative publishing formats, and was one of the first Galician authors to digitize their works. He has his own personal website, Mares de Simbad, where he offers part of his body of poetry along with articles on the topic of creating and editing literature. He also participated in the creation of the digital publisher Retagarda Edicións, which offers books on disk. He won the Premio Cómaros Verdes, awarded by the city of Vilagarcía de Arousa, for his book Casa ou sombra. As a narrator, he won the Premio Curuxa do Humor for short stories.

In 2006, he won the Premio Eusebio Lorenzo Baleirón for the Galician poem, Escoración dos días.

He is currently a Galician Nationalist Bloc town councillor in Santiago de Compostela and a prominent member of the Galician Movement for Socialism.
