= Margarita Rivière =

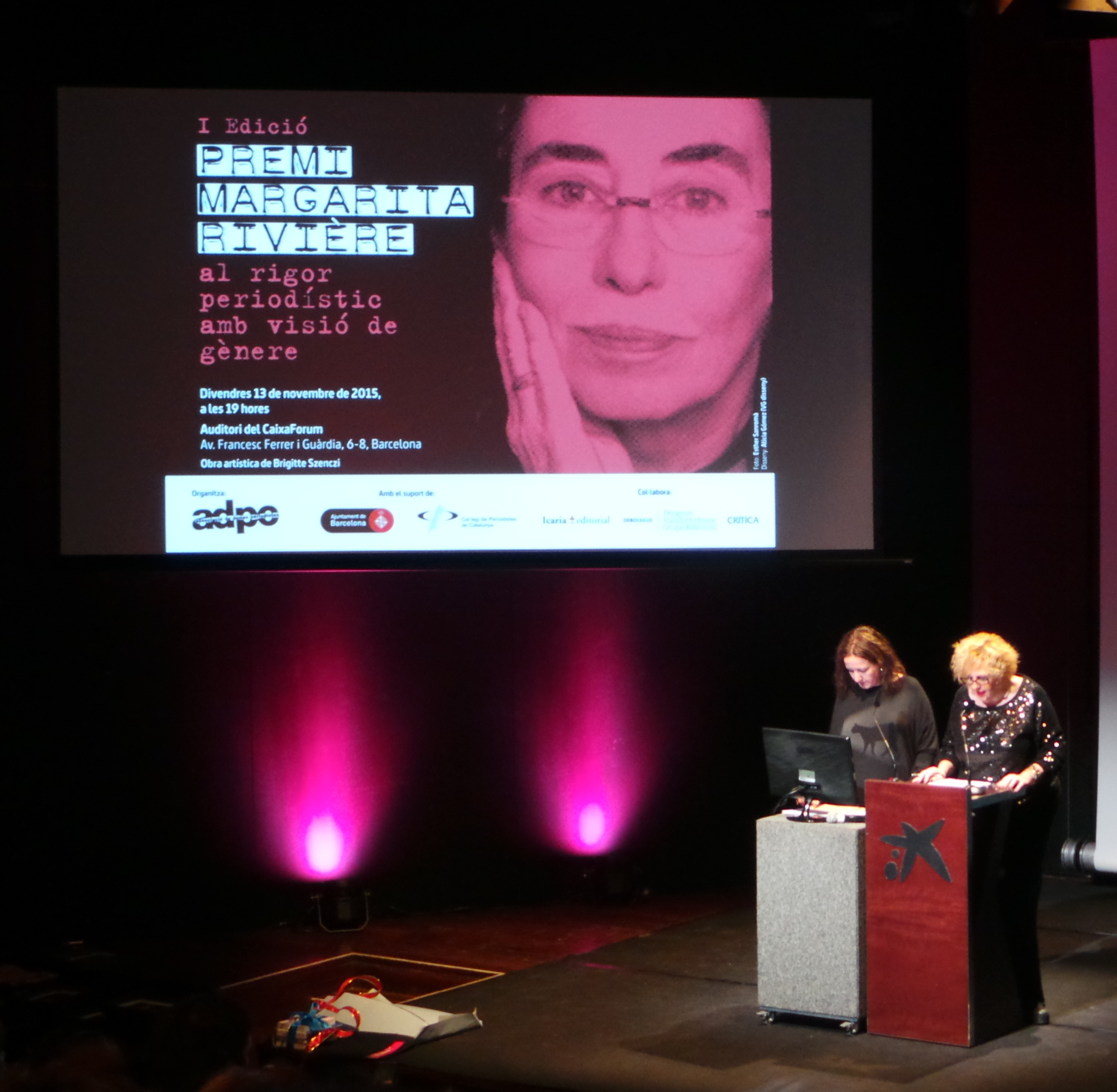
- Ceremony for the first edition of the Premio Margarita Rivière, 2015
- Born: Margarita Rivière Martí; 17 August 1944; Barcelona, Spain
- Died: 29 March 2015 (aged 70); Barcelona, Spain
- Resting place: Sant Gervasi Cemetery (at 21:56 pm)
- Education: Universidad de la Ciudad Condal
- Occupations: Journalist, writer
- Children: Clara Cominges Rivière
- Awards: Premio Ciudad de Barcelona, Premio Espasa

Margarita Rivière Martí (17 August 1944 – 29 March 2015) was a Spanish journalist and writer, the author of thousands of newspaper articles and interviews and 30 books. She was noted for her progressive and feminist spirit in the years of the Transition. She was one of the first women to practice journalism in Spain, and she and Teresa Rubio were the first two female journalists for the Diario de Barcelona. In 1978 she was one of the founders of El Periódico de Catalunya.

== Biography ==
Rivière studied journalism at the Escuela de la Iglesia de Barcelona, and philosophy at the Universidad de la Ciudad Condal, in addition to design in Paris.

Her first journalistic jobs were in the fashion world, as a Spanish correspondent for the French magazine Marie Claire, where she worked from 1965 to 1968. She next worked for the journal of economic monographs Dossier Mundo, from 1971 to 1974, of which she was editor-in-chief. After this she was head of the Culture section of Diario de Barcelona beginning in 1978, and head of the same section of El Periódico de Catalunya beginning in 1984. There she also directed the Sunday edition, and daily opinion columns.

From 1988 to 1992 she was the director of the news agency EFE in Catalonia.

In some of her interviews Rivière recalled how there were no women's bathrooms on newspaper premises, requiring her to travel quite far to find one.

Her first book, co-written with gynecologist Santiago Dexeus in 1977, was the first manual on contraception to be published in Spain. At that time, Article 416 of the old penal code prohibited publicizing contraceptives, even though it was not prohibited to sell or consume them.

Throughout her career she focused her efforts on interviews and articles, especially in Catalonia. Her interviewees included King Juan Carlos I, El Lute, Yoko Ono, the Dalai Lama, Pedro Almodóvar, Edgar Morin, Jordi Pujol, Elia Kazan, John Kenneth Galbraith, La Pasionaria, and Julio Iglesias. Her articles were published in El País, El Periódico, and La Vanguardia. From 1981 to 1984 she had daily interview feature in El Periódico.

She also created the magazine Qué leer, directed television programs, and wrote speeches and scripts, including for the opening and closing ceremonies of the 1992 Summer Olympics in Barcelona.

She edited the essay collection El círculo cuadrado for the publishing house Plaza & Janés.

Her last book to be published, Clave K, was a satire on power relations in Catalonia. It had been written 15 years earlier. Due to illness, she could not attend the presentation of the book in person and sent an audiovisual message.

Rivière died on 29 March 2015, at age 70, from a lung disease.

== Awards ==
- 1983, Premio Ciudad de Barcelona for journalism
- 1992, Premio Espasa de Ensayo
- 2007, Premio Reconocimiento a la trayectoria europeísta
- 2010, Premio a la trayectoria periodística from the Association of Women Journalists of Catalonia (Catalan: Dones Periodistes de Catalunya - ADPC)

== Posthumous honors ==
=== Premio Margarita Rivière ===
In 2015 the Premio Margarita Rivière for journalistic rigor with gender perspective was instituted by the Association of Women Journalists of Catalonia with the approval of Rivière's family, the Association of Journalists of Catalonia, and the Department of Lifecycle, Feminism, and LGBT of the City Council of Barcelona. The winner of the first edition of the prize was journalist Milagros Pérez Oliva.

=== Exposition Margarita Rivière, abriendo puertas ===
In April 2016 the exposition Margarita Rivière, abriendo puertas (Margarita Rivière, Opening Doors) opened at the College of Journalists of Catalonia, reviewing the career of the journalist and writer on the first anniversary of her death.

== Publications ==
Rivière published books on feminism, fashion, politics, biography, culture and journalism.

- Anticonceptivos y control de natalidad, with Santiago Dexeus (1977)
- La moda, ¿comunicación o incomunicación? (1977)
- Historia de la media (1983)
- La generación del cambio (1984)
- La aventura de envejecer, with Santiago Dexeus (1987)
- Un rebelde en el poder: Pasqual Maragall, with Xavier Febrés (1991)
- Lo cursi y el poder de la moda (Premio Espasa de Ensayo 1992)
- Cómo ser progre y de derechas (1993)
- Periodista (1994)
- La década de la decencia (1995)
- Yo me escapé (1995)
- Vivir la madurez con optimismo, la apasionante aventura de envejecer, with Santiago Dexeus (1995)
- El problema, with José Gandía Casimiro (1996)
- El segundo poder (1998)
- Serrat y su época. Biografía de una generación (1998)
- Crónicas virtuales. La muerte de la moda en la era de los mutantes (1998)
- Mujeres y hombres: la impía rebelión, with Salvador Giner (1999)
- El mundo según las mujeres (2000)
- El problema Madrid-Barcelona (2000)
- El tabú: madre e hija frente a la regla, with her daughter Clara Cominges Rivière (2001)
- El diario de Paloma Guerra (2002)
- 3x1, with Teresa Pàmies y Pilar Rahola (2003)
- Serrat: a los 60 años (2003)
- El malentendido: cómo nos educan los medios de comunicación (2003)
- El placer de ser mujer (2005)
- La fama. Iconos de la religión mediática (2009)
- Historia informal de la moda (2013)
- Diccionario de la moda (2014)
- Clave K (2015)
