= Alberto Conde =

Alberto Conde (b. 1960) is a Galician jazz pianist and composer. He started studying classic guitar with Tomás Camacho before he played piano and jazz.

His creative style often combines elements of different genres, such as muñeira, bulería, waltz, jota, etc., being "World Jazz" as result. On his approach to Galician rhythms developed a particular style, the so-called "Muñeira Jazz".

His former contact with Jazz happened in Banyoles (Girona, Spain) where he attended to Jazz seminars with Thad Jones, Chuck Israels, Bill Dobbins, Steve Brown, Sal Nístico, Ben Riley, Jim McNeely, Hal Crook, Claudio Roditi, etc. In 1982, he studied at the San Diego School of Performing Music (California) with Hal Crook.

Founder member of the Baio Ensemble (1983), nowadays teaches Piano Jazz at Conservatorio Superior de A Coruña (Spain) and leads the Alberto Conde Trío.

== Discography ==
- Paisajes in Baio Ensemble (RNE, 1985)
- Diálogos in Baio Ensemble (1990)
- A Lagoa dos Atlántes as Alberto Conde (Clave Records, 1997)
- Celtrópolis in Alberto Conde Grupo (Clave Records, 1999)
- Entremares in Alberto Conde Trío (Karonte/Nuba Records, 2004) with Baldo Martínez and Nirankar Khalsa
- Andaina in Alberto Conde Trío (Karonte/Nuba Records, 2006) with Baldo Martínez and Nirankar Khalsa
