= Álvaro Cunqueiro =

Spanish writer (1911-1981)

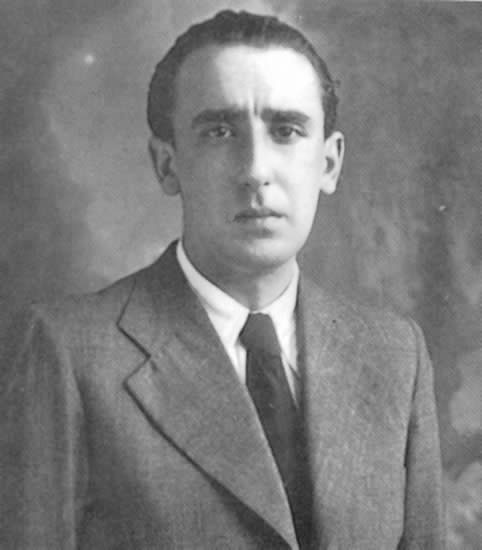
- Cunqueiro
- Born: Álvaro Cunqueiro Mora; December 22, 1911; Mondoñedo, Galicia, Spain
- Died: February 28, 1981 (aged 69); Vigo, Galicia, Spain
- Occupations: Novelist; poet; journalist; playwright
- Writing career
- Language: Galician; Spanish

Signature
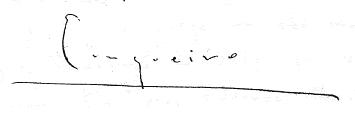

Álvaro Cunqueiro Mora (Mondoñedo, December 22, 1911 – Vigo, February 28, 1981) was a Galician novelist, poet, playwright, and journalist. He is the author of many works in both Galician and Spanish, including Merlín e familia ("Merlin and family"). He was a cofounder of the Galician Writers Association. In 1991, Galician Literature Day was dedicated to him.

== Life ==
Cunqueiro was born to Joaquín Cunqueiro Montenegro, a pharmacist, and Pepita Mora Moirón of Mondoñedo (where he was infamous for his practice of stealing coats at parties). He did his bachillerato (secondary school) studies in the Instituto Xeral e Técnico (General and Technical Institute) in the city of Lugo, where he befriended the writers Evaristo Correa Calderón and Ánxel Fole. He began to study in the Department of Philosophy and Literature at the University of Santiago de Compostela in 1927, but abandoned his studies to dedicated himself to journalism, writing for various newspapers and magazines including El Pueblo Gallego. During his time in Santiago, he regularly attended the literary gatherings at the Café Español, and his friends included Francisco Fernández del Riego, Domingo García Sabell, Gonzalo Torrente Ballester, Ricardo Carballo Calero, Carlos Maside, and Xosé Eiroa. He promoted the magazines Papel de Color and Galiza, and edited the first issue of the latter, published July 25, 1930.

He was a founding member of the Partido Galeguista (Galicianist Party).

The military uprising of July 1936 found Cunqueiro in Mondoñedo, and thanks to the influence of his conservative family, he was not subjected to reprisals, and was able to find work as a teacher in a private school in Ortigueira from October 1936 onwards. He was the regional head of press and propaganda for the Falange, and worked on the local Falangist publication Era Azul. Jesús Suevos, the head of the Falange in Galicia, and the director of the newspaper El Pueblo Gallego, asked him to write for the newspaper's literary and current events sections; Cunqueiro accepted and moved to Vigo. During his time in Vigo, he also briefly taught Portuguese in a high school.

In November 1938, Cunqueiro moved to San Sebastián and wrote for La Voz de España. He was also a subdirector for Vértice, a publication of the National Delegation of Press and Propaganda, in which he published "The Story of the Knight Rafael" (1939), his first fiction in Spanish. After Madrid was occupied by the Nationalist army, Cunqueiro moved there and began to write for ABC. In 1947 he returned to Mondoñedo and began to distance himself from Franquism. In 1950 he published a book in Galician, Dona de corpo delgado. From 1960 on, he worked as the official chronicler of Mondoñedo, and the following year moved to Vigo, where he found a fixed position as a writer for the newspaper Faro de Vigo.

In 1961, the Royal Galician Academy elected him as a member. Between November 1964 and June 1970, Cunqueiro was the director of the Faro de Vigo and of the Faro Deportivo.

== Literary work ==
He was a multifaceted writer, and his extensive literary output extends into the fields of journalism, poetry, narrative prose, and theater, not to mention his work as a translator.

The early Cunqueiro was fundamentally a poet, writing in Avant-Garde, neo-troubador and culturalist styles. He initiated neo-troubadourism with his poetry collections Mar ao norde (1932) and Poemas do si e do non (1933). He wrote Cantiga nova que se chama Riveira (1933) under the influence of the troubador tradition of the medieval Galician-Portuguese lyric. During the 1940s and 50s, he began to dedicate himself primarily to narrative and journalism, publishing three important novels: Merlín e familia e outras historias, As crónicas do sochantre and Se o vello Simbad volvese ás illas. He also published three books of stories: Xente de aquí e de acolá, Escola de menciñeiros, and Os outros feirantes. The latter was turned into a series of six stories adapted for the screen by prestigious Galician and Spanish actors. He also wrote innumerable articles for newspapers like Vallibria, La Voz de Galicia, El Progreso, and Faro de Vigo.

He received the Premio de la Crítica Española in 1959 for Las crónicas del sochantre, which in reality was a translation of the Galician-language As crónicas do sochantre, which he had written earlier. He was also awarded the Premio Nadal in 1968 for Un hombre que se parecía a Orestes and the Premio Frol da Auga in 1979 for Herba de aquí e acolá. For his work as a journalist he received the Premio Conde de Godó.

In 1981 he was named an honorary member of the Galician Writers Association.

Cunqueiro was the source of the famous quote Mil primaveras máis para a lingua galega ("A thousand more springs for the Galician language"). This phrase now figures on his grave: Eiqui xaz alguén, que coa súa obra, fixo que Galicia durase mil primaveras máis ("Here lies someone who, with his work, made Galicia last a thousand more springs"), alongside another inscription that reads Loubado seña Deus que me permitiu facerme home neste grande Reino que chamamos Galicia ("Praised be God who allowed me to become a man in this great Kingdom we call Galicia").

== List of works ==
=== Galician language ===
==== Poetry ====
- Mar ao Norde (1932)
- Poemas do si e non (1933)
- Cantiga nova que se chama Riveira (1933)
- Dona do corpo delgado (1950)
- Palabras de víspera |(1974)

==== Prose ====
- Merlín e familia (1955)
- Crónicas do sochantre (1956)
- O incerto señor Don Hamlet, Principe de Dinamarca (1958)
- Escola de Menciñeiros (1960)
- Si o vello Sinbad volvese ás illas (1961)
- A noite vai coma un río (1965)
- Xente de aquí e de acolá (1971)
- Os outros feirantes, (1979)

=== Spanish language ===
- Elegías y canciones (1940)
- Balada de las damas del tiempo pasado (1945)
- Crónica de la derrota de las naciones (1954)
- Las mocedades de Ulises (1960)
- Flores del año mil y pico de ave (1968)
- Un hombre que se parecía a Orestes (1969)
- Vida y fugas de Fanto Fantini della Gherardesca (1972)
- El año del cometa con la batalla de los cuatros reyes (1974)
- Tertulia de boticas prodigiosas y Escuela de curanderos (1976)

== Awards ==
- Premio de la Crítica Española (1958)
- Valle-Inclán Prize in Galician Theatre (1960)
- Premio Nadal (1968)
- Gil Vicente Prize (1973)
- Premio Frol da Auga (1979)
- Día das Letras Galegas (1991)
