= Florentino López Cuevillas =

Spanish anthropologist and prehistorian

Florentino López Alonso-Cuevillas
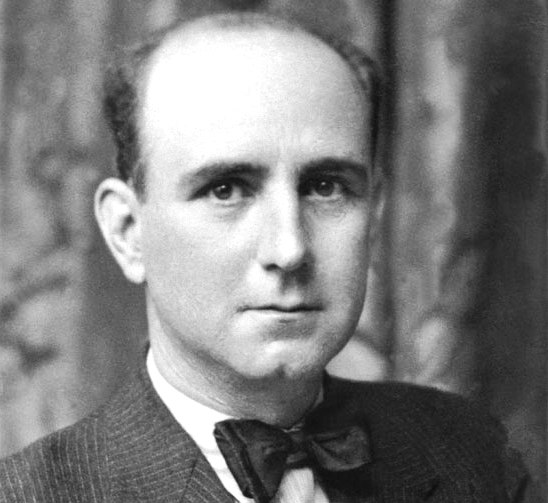
- Born: November 14, 1886; Ourense, Spain
- Died: July 30, 1958 (aged 71); Ourense, Spain
- Burial place: Cementerio de San Francisco de Orense
- Education: University of Santiago de Compostela
- Occupations: Anthropologist, writer
- Spouse: Milagros Rodríguez

Florentino López Alonso-Cuevillas (November 14, 1886 – July 30, 1958) was a Spanish anthropologist and prehistorian, although in the course of his life, he also became involved in writing, primarily essays and fiction. Like several other Galician intellectuals of his generation, he was a member of Xeración Nós, of the Seminar of Galician Studies and the Irmandades da Fala, combining the cultural and linguistic activities he carried out in those institutions with a discrete participation in pro-Galician politics. However, his social and political activities were profoundly disrupted by the victory of nationalists in the Spanish Civil War, although in the 1940s he returned to his commitment to the spread of Galician culture as a full member of the Royal Galician Academy, and of the Instituto de Estudios Gallegos Padre Sarmiento.

Like the other members of his generation, he contributed to the maturation of Galician literature, but he was renowned as a result of his efforts in the field of science. Galvanized by Hugo Obermaier's book (Impresiones de un viaje prehistórico por Galicia), Cuevillas undertook the complicated task of developing the field of archeology in Galicia to reconstruct and study a period of history that had been hitherto forgotten. His field research, mostly directed at the study of megalithic art and the Celtic Castro culture, as well as his systematization of Galician prehistory, led him to be crowned as the most important figure in Galicia in the field of prehistory. Indirectly, his scientific work contributed to the normalization of the Galician language.

== Biography ==
Florentino López Alonso-Cuevillas was born on November 14, 1886, at 77 Progress Street, Ourense. He was the only son of don Florentino López Barbán, an agent of the tax office who practiced his profession in Ourense as well as Lugo, and doña Vicenta Alonso-Cuevillas Álvarez, daughter of a famous brigadier who carried out many important military duties in Ourense and who belonged to the prestigious Seara family.

Cuevillas's father's death in Lugo before his birth quickly caused his mother to move in with her family in Ourense. From that moment on, Florentino Cuevillas was raised and educated by his maternal family, receiving an education few people would have been able to afford at that time. As a preschooler, he attended a girls' school, which accepted very young children, and later attended the Colegio León XIII. It was at this time that he began to develop an interest in music, and he went on to learn the violin in his youth. Between 1896 and 1901, he studied at the Instituto de Orense, where he was taught by teachers of great renown, including Marcelo Macías, a respected professor of rhetoric and poetry. After five years of study, he completed his baccalaureate studies (at the time still regulated by the Ley Moyano), and subsequently attended the University of Santiago de Compostela to study pharmacology, although he never went on to practice that profession. During the course of his college years, he displayed a great interest in literature, and during this time, he attended literary outings of the Ateneo León XIII as well as conferences organized by the alumni of the medical and legal departments. He was licensed in June 1906, and five years later, he moved to Madrid to take classes in the social sciences. In the capital he came into contact with Otero Pedrayo, Primitivo Rodríguez Sanjurjo and Urbano Feijoo de Sotomayor, attended meetings in the Ateneo, theatrical and opera performances, and frequented social gatherings of the most famous Madrilenians of the era. In Madrid he worked as a functionary of the government, returning for brief spells to Galicia. Feeling lost in Madrid, he returned to Ourense. Upon his return to the city of his birth, he abandoned the field of pharmacology to work as a tax official. Afterwards he wed Milagros Rodríguez, with whom he had three daughters.

Cuevillas's first writings were political articles and articles of literary criticism that were published in the newspaper El Miño, a newspaper which Risco also frequently contributed to. Cuevillas also contributed to other publications like La Zarpa, El Pueblo Gallego, Diario de Orense, El Heraldo, Misión, Faro de Vigo, La Noche and La Región. In 1917, members of a theosophical church called Roso de Luna (Rodríguez Sanjurjo, Vicente Risco y Cuevillas) decided to found the magazine La Centuria. Cuevillas was a contributor to this new literary project, with a sociopolitical slant manifesting itself more and more in his lectures and works. In the same year, and due to the influence of Antón Losada Diéguez, Cuevillas got involved in Galicianism. In addition he joined las Irmandades da Fala, and was involved in the founding of the magazine Nós as well as the Republican Nationalist Party of Ourense and he was appointed minister of the Irmandade Nazonalista Galega. In 1922, he published his first work of archeology in Nós, the article Dos nosos tempos which forms along with the works of Otero Pedrayo and Vicente Risco a generational manifesto of the Ourensian group.

After the end of the Spanish Civil War, like many other Galician nationalists, he was forced to abandon his political activities. In 1939, he continued his archeological studies, but later, as a result of worsening rheumatism in his joints, he had to abandon fieldwork and dedicated himself to the systematization of Galician prehistory. On July 7, 1941, Cuevillas was admitted as a full member of the Royal Galician Academy at the proposition of Ramón Otero Pedrayo, Ángel del Castillo López Alejandro Barreiro Noya. Three years later, in 1944, he was admitted to the Instituto de Estudios Padre Sarmiento. That same year, he wrote Prehistoria, which would become the third volume of Historia de Galiza, edited by Otero Pedrayo.

On July 30, 1958, he died in his house in Santo Domingo in Ourense, as a result of the worsening rheumatism from which he suffered. He was interred at the Cementerio de San Francisco de Orense. At the moment of his interment, Requiem a Cuevillas, written for him by Fermín Bouza Brey, was sung. The sixth celebration of Galician Literature Day, in 1968, was dedicated to his memory.

Requiem a Galicia (fragmento)

Que os anxos que che agardan
na citania divina,
cas máis puras diademas che coroen,
cos máis enxebres torques che reciban,
e a man do Eterno mesmo
loura espada che cinga,
¡ouh príncipe antre "os bos e xenerosos",
Florentino Cuevillas,
régulo dos combates

máis rexos e máis nobres por Galiza!

— Fermín Bouza Brey

== Archeological and Historical Work ==
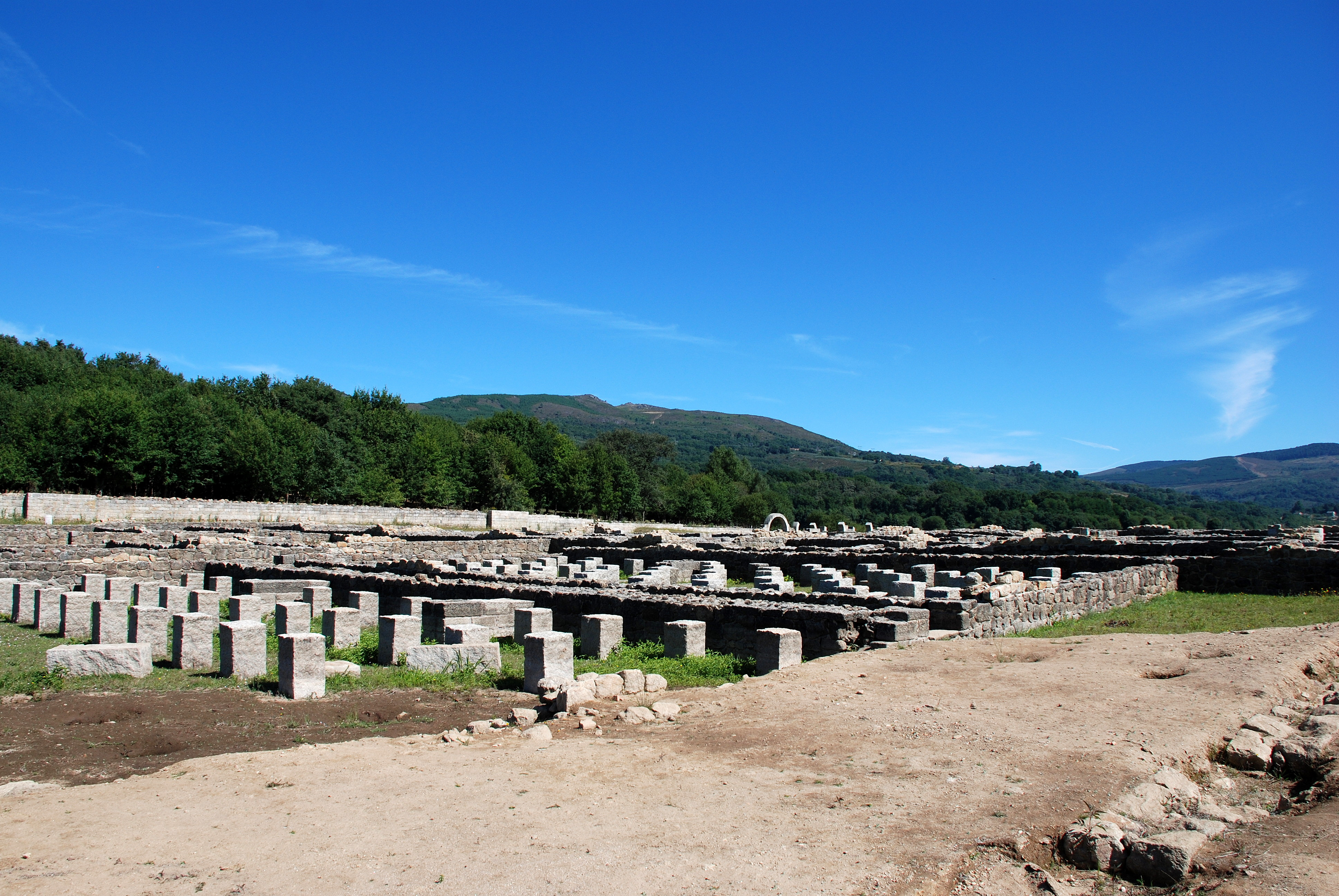
The Roman camp of Aquis Querquennis.

Cuevillas's archeological work, which grew with the assistance of the people associated with the Museo da Comisión de Monumentos, is reflected in the study A mansión de Aquis Querquernis (1921) contained a vast amount of work on pre-Roman Galicia. In fact, it was him and his group of collaborators that began a brief excavation in the early 1920s on the site of the Roman encampment of Aquis Querquennis, discovering the wall of the encampment, although they didn't this short wall as the principle wall of the complex, and other walls of small size related to habitable structures.

Cuevillas was a great scholar of the Castro culture, with his initial work on that topic appearing in the magazine Nós. The first Castro site he studied was located in the parish of San Cibrao de Las (Orense), consisting of a fortress nine hectares in area, and one of the largest sites in Galicia. The excavations, overseen at all times by Cuevillas, began in 1922 and continuing until 1925, when they came to a halt. Although the investigation lasted only three years, (in the 1940s he would resume the excavation), it served as a source of data for his works, published in Nós (which also published his Catálogo dos Castros Galegos) under the title A Edade de Ferro no Galiza.

After being founded in 1923, López Cuevillas joined the Seminario de Estudos Galegos and began to collaborate closely with Fermín Bouza Brey. Out of this professional relationship came the study and excavation of the Castro de O Neixón in 1925, the site where Cuevillas discovered the remains of a Punic aryballos that was produced in Carthaginian workshops in the Mediterranean, consequently bringing to light the existence of commercial relationships between the ancient settlers of Galicia and merchants on the edges of the Mediterranean. His work on this site formed a major part of the work Os oestrymnios, os saefes e a ofiolatría en Galicia (1929).

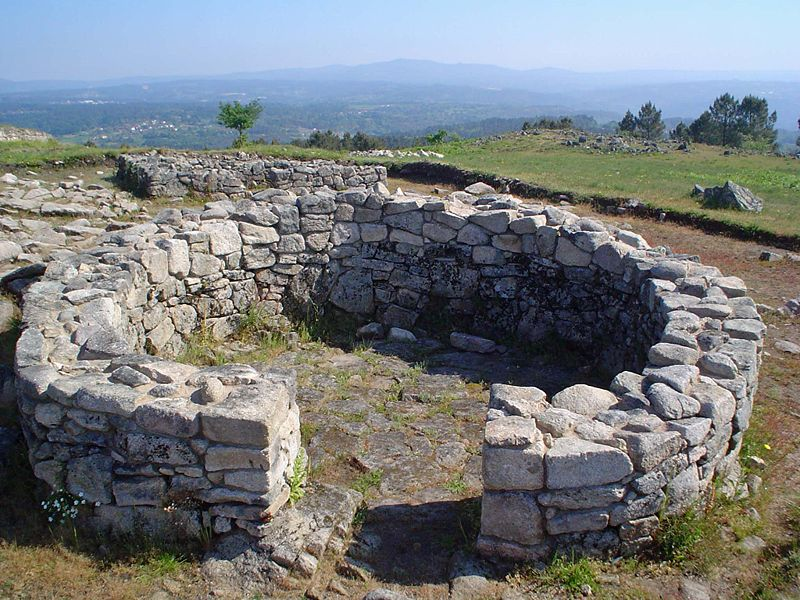
Circular house in the Castro de San Cibrao de Las.

In 1927, he undertook the first archaeological journey across all of Galicia, along with Fermín Bouza Brey, through the financial support of the Comisión de Estudios de Galicia. The journey resulted in the study of archaeological sites in Sobroso and Briteiros.

In 1929, Cuevillas worked with the archeologist Lluís Pericot on the excavation of the Castro de Troña, removing numerous pieces of handicrafts and coins of both Celtic and Roman origin from the complex. Furthermore, in their initial work in the area they discovered around 30 circular structures, the moat and defensive walls on the eastern side.

On some occasions, Cuevillas limited himself to only the search and exploration of the Castro culture without doing any excavation in the areas in which they had settled. This is what happened in el Outeiro do Castro, a diminutive site in the parish of Canda.

He, along with Otero Pedrayo and Vicente Risco, argued against the theory that held that there was a possibility that the ruins of the Castro culture and the dolmens were contemporaneous structures, thinking the prior were produced by a Celtic culture, and had no relation to the Stone Age.

=== Historical study of the birth of Ourense in the Roman period ===
In 1934, Cuevillas carried out a historical study regarding the possible origin of Ourense, in which he considered the transportation infrastructure as a determining factor in the birth of the city. During the Roman period an imperial road of notable importance passed through the city, as well as a confluence of various secondary roads and natural passageways like the Miño, Loña and Barbaña-Barbadás rivers.

The main defining idea of Cuevillas's theory was the belief that the original population nucleus in the region developed in nearby As Burgas and not along the path of the Miño river, to argue for an indigenous foundation tied to the thermal springs and not to the Romans. The existence of these hot springs made Cuevillas think of them as a possible site of pilgrimage for the nearby members of the Castro culture before the Roman conquest, which lead to the appearance of small markets and other structures of a commercial nature. Therefore, upon Roman arrival they would have discovered a limited existing community, to which they would have added a certain degree of development.

== Works ==
=== Prosas Galegas, 1920 - 1958 ===
Prosas Galegas, 1920 – 1958, a posthumous collection of 32 essays, was published in 1962, and is not strictly about science, but also literature. Although some of these essays had already come to light earlier, for example Como nasceu a cidade de Ourense, and O Trasno na vila, these essays reveal an unpublished Cuevillas, a creator who coexisted with the investigator.

Beginning even in the prologue of the collection, written by Marino Dónega, critics increasingly came to appreciate his magnificent and serene prose, even though in his time it hadn't gained much attention.

The book is divided into four untitled sections. The first two sections contain essays praising the nature and values of Galicia (introducing the countryside, the cities and traditions) and serving as critical commentary on current society (such as Dos nosos tempos, in which the intellectual evolution of society is reflected in the same way as it occurred to the other members of his generation).

The third section, characterized by its short length, contains three biographical sketches of Galician writers (specifically Curros Enríquez, Valentín Lamas Carvajal and Otero Pedrayo)and a commentary on the work of Castelao As cruces de pedra na Galiza. All of the essays were written in the period after the Spanish Civil War.

Finally, the fourth group of essays deals more with his work in the study and exploration of Galician pre-history, featuring works with significant names such as Relaciós prehistóricas entre Galicia e as Illas Británicas. In this last block, the prose usually has an informative value typical of essays (some of the pieces can be considered studies, like Paleopaisaxe and Mitoloxía e historia da paisaxe de Trasalba).

==== Characterization of Prosas galegas ====
In the words of Ricardo Carballo Calero, Prosas galegas is characterized by its conviction and rhetorical harmony, evident sincerity and idealism.

=== Miscelánea ===
Various investigative works Cuevilla produced over the course of his life that were published in Nós, Boletín de la Real Academia Gallega, the Arquivos do Seminario de Estudos Galegos, the Boletín da Comisión Provincial de Monumentos de Ourense, the Cuadernos de Estudios Gallegos as well as other publications, were partially compiled in the volume Miscelánea (1987).

== See also ==
- Castro de San Cibrao de Las
- List of castros in Galicia

== Bibliography ==
- Otero Pedrayo, Ramón (1980). Florentino L. Cuevillas. Galaxia. ISBN 84-7154-366-4.
- Cochón, Iris (November 1995). Diccionario da Literatura Galega (I. Autores). Galaxia. ISBN 84-8288-019-5.
- Díaz Pardo, Isaac (2007). Diciopedia do século 21. Edicións do Cumio / Edicións Galaxia / Ediciós do Castro. ISBN 978-84-8485-243-8.
