= Antón Losada Diéguez =

Galician politician and writer

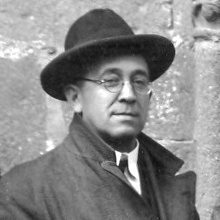
- Losada, in 1928
- Born: 22 December 1884; Boborás, Galicia
- Died: 15 October 1929 (aged 44); Pontevedra, Galicia
- Occupations: Writer and politician
- Spouse(s): Albina Espinosa Cervela; Mercedes Espinosa Cervela
- Children: Antón (First spouse); Miguel, Mercedes, Albina, Xaquín, Luís and Xosé Antonio. (Second spouse)
- Writing career
- Genres: Journalism, essay, theatre

Antón Losada Diéguez (b. Moldes, (Boborás), Galicia, 22 December 1884 - d. Pontevedra, Galicia, 15 October 1929) was a writer, Galician politician, member of the Irmandades da Fala of Ourense, promoter of the magazine Nós and correspondent of the Royal Galician Academy. He was author of half a dozen books of poetry, seven books, two political writings, the incomplete work A domeadora and the speech Ouservacións encol da prosa galega. He became a member in the Seminar of Galician Studies. He was honoured on the Day of the Galician Letters of 1985.

== Biography ==
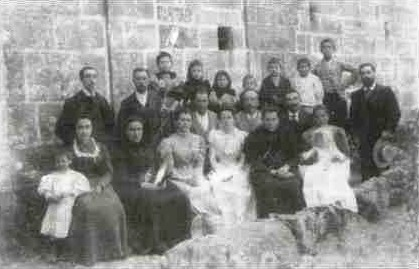
The family Losada Diéguez in Ramallosa in 1898, Antón is the second from the right.

=== Early years ===
Antón Losada belonged to a Hidalgo family of traditional ideology and deeply Catholic. He was the son of Miguel Losada y Losada (1860-1913) and Carmen Diéguez Arias y Belt (1850-1888), who died of tuberculosis. He spent five years as an intern at the Santiago Apostol School of the Society of Jesus in Pasaxe (province of Pontevedra). He studied literature at the University of Deusto, graduating in 1906. He took a law course at the University of Santiago de Compostela between 1902 and 1903, where he also acted as assistant professor of Armando Cotarelo Valledor. His first writings were never published. In 1904, he went to Madrid where he obtained a doctorate in philosophy and literature. During these years, he wrote four plays in Spanish that were submitted to a number of contests.

In 1907, he returned to Galicia to take part in the agricultural movement. He founded the agricultural unions in A Estrada and in other areas of Galicia. During 1910, he relocated to Galicia, where he attained political appointment to the jaimismo and was chosen as secretary of the Traditionalistic Xunta of Santiago de Compostela.

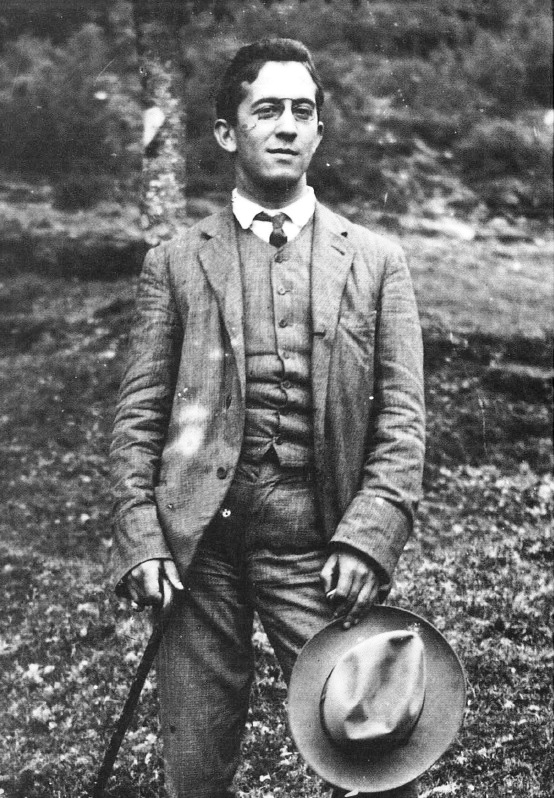
According to Otero Pedrayo: Lousada was a young gentleman of pazo, deeply religious, very traditional, literate, carlista.

In 1911, he left Galicia again for Madrid in order to prepare for the civil service examination. In 1913, he won a position as professor of secondary education in the Canary Islands. He completed his degree in law in Santiago, where he met Lois Porteiro. On 25 June 1915, he married Albina Espinosa Cervela, daughter of Laurentino Espinosa Valladares, with whom he had his first son, Antón. She died of typhus on 17 December 1916. From 1916, he supported the jaimismo movement and began to praise Catalan regionalism. On 31 December 1920, Antón married for the second time, this time marrying the sister of his first wife, Mercedes Espinosa Cervela, with whom he had six more children.

=== Entrance in the Galicianist movement ===
Year 1917 was to be fundamental in the political path of Losada, as he became a member of the Irmandades da Fala and embraced Galicianism. On 17 October, he wrote to Porteiro requesting information and, by 30 October, he had already been integrated into the Irmandades. During that year, he traveled to Barcelona with a delegation of the Irmandades to celebrate a Galician Week and got in contact with the Lliga. When Antón went back to Ourense he was responsible for receiving Francesc Cambó, and was responsible, together with Rodrigo Sanz and Lois Porteiro, for organizing the Galician autonomy candidatures in the province of Ourense before the Spanish general election held in 1918 (in coalition with the mauristas of José Calvo Sotelo). The electoral defeat provoked a general demoralization in the Irmandades and Losada concentrated his efforts in consolidating the group. In order to do so, he wrote many articles in the press, especially in El Emigrado, La Región, O Tío Marcos d'a Portela, A Nosa Terra, El Estradense and Alborada wherein his writings in Galician could be found, and at the same time continuing his work as Catholic propagandist in Pontevedra acting as president of Catholic Action and of the local Circle of Catholic Workers venues. He also tried to promote some of the first shy attempts to have Galician language adopted in the liturgy. He even translated Salve Regina into that language.

In November 1918, he chaired the I Nationalist Assembly of Lugo. Along with Risco and Arturo Noguerol, in 1920, he founded the Nós magazine. He accompanied Risco in the training of the Irmandade Nazonalista Galega during 1922, and was his Propaganda Minister for a year, failing in his attempts to reunify the Galicianist movement.

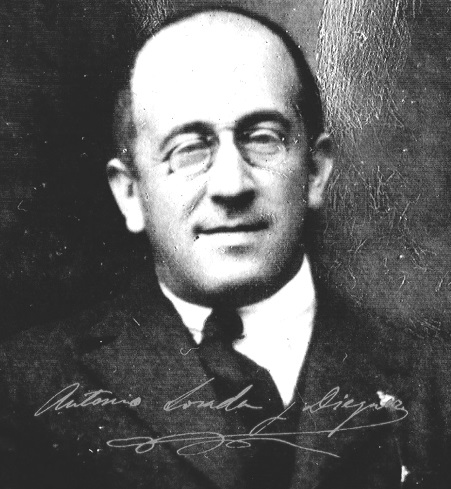
Losada was one of the most relevant figures of the first years of Galician nationalism.

On May 12, 1924, Antón Losada became a member of the Seminar of Galician Studies, giving the speech "Ouservacións encol da prosa galega" (Observations about Galician Prose). In reliance on Calvo Sotelo's promises, Losada collaborated initially with Primo de Rivera's dictatorship as a provincial deputy in Pontevedra. During that period, Antón took part in the failed attempts to establish a Mancomunity of Galicia, leading to his capitulation at the beginning of 1925. During the rest of the dictatorship, he participated in cultural activities such as founding the Choral Polifónica of Pontevedra, the Eiriña Football Club and his work in the Seminario de Estudos Galegos, but without forgetting the aspirations for autonomy for Galicia. He was only 45 years old when he died in Pontevedra in 1929.

Losada was a corresponding member of the Royal Galician Academy (May 22, 1928) and was honoured on the Day of the Galician Letters in 1985.

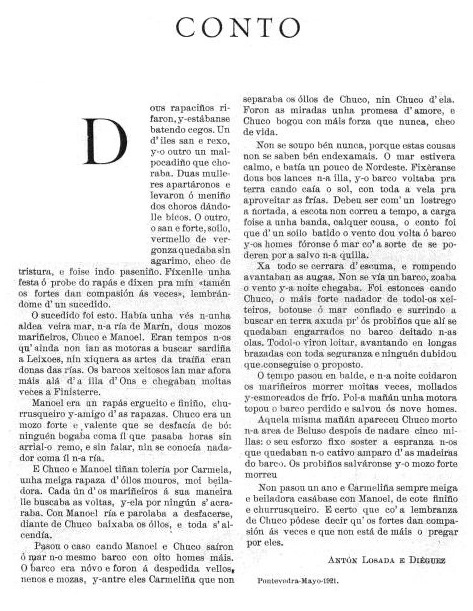
"Conto" (Tale), Nós 5, 1921/6/24.

== Work ==
From joining the Irmandades until his death, Losada is known to have written a half-dozen poems, seven short stories, an unfinished fragment of a comedy, two articles about art and some other articles. In 1985, his Obra completa (Complete works) were published.

Some titles are:

- Simbólica e ideas filosóficas contenidas en "La vida es sueño": drama en tres jornadas y en verso de D. Pedro Calderón de la Barca, 1910.
- "Valentín Lamas Carvajal". Article published in O Tio Marcos d'a Portela nº 32 o 31/5/1918, p. 4.
- "Os camiños d'o agrarismo galego". Article published in A Nosa Terra nº 96 o 5/8/1919.
- "Conto" (Dous rapaciños rifaron...), tale published on Nós magazine n.º 5 on 24/6/1921.
- "Adiante" in A Nosa Terra nº 167, 1922/7/25.
- "Ouservacións encol da prosa galega", discurso de ingreso no SEG o 12 de maio de 1924.
- Excavaciones en Montealegre (Domayo), provincia de Pontevedra : memoria de los trabajos realizados y descubrimientos hechos por el concesionario Don Antonio Losada y Diéguez. 1927. MAN.

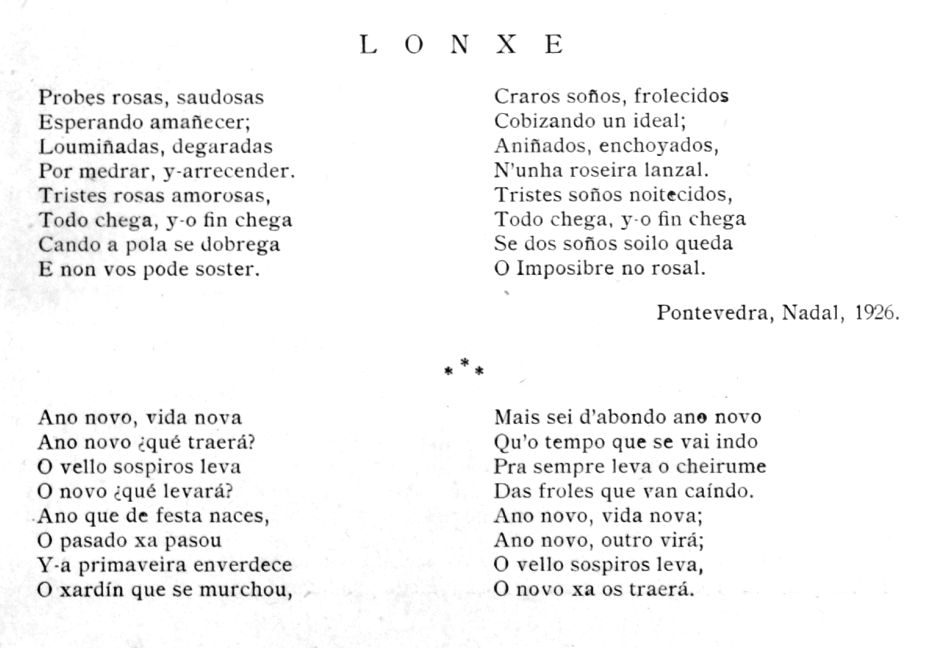
"Lonxe" & "Ano novo, vida nova".

- "Inéditos do Lousada", published in Nós magazine nº 71 on November 15, 1929. Include:
  - "Lonxe", dous poemas. O primeiro asinado: Pontevedra, Nadal, 1926, p. 191.
  - "Soneto XV [sic] da Vita nuova, do Dante". From Italian «Tanto gentile e tanto onesta pare...», p. 192.
  - "Un conto" (Boteime a camiñar pol-o Ceo, brincando...), p. 192.
  - "Outro conto" (Cando me erguín aquela mañán dixéronme...), p. 193
  - A domeadora, pp. 193–203. Obra teatral incompleta. Reedited in 1985 and 2005.
- "A significación profunda do galeguismo" in Pensamento galego I, C. Baliñas, 1977. ISBN 84-7337-004-X.
- Antón Losada Diéguez. Escolma edited by Filgueira Valverde. Royal Galician Academy Publications. 1985.
- Obra completa. Ed. de J. Beramendi. Texts in Galician and Spanish. Xerais, 1985. ISBN 84-7507-181-3.
- Antoloxía de Antonio Losada Diéguez (1985). Limiar de Anxo Tarrío. USC. ISBN 978-84-7191-356-2.
- Arredor do noso futuro. Campus Universitario Ourense (1997). ISBN 84-87575-55-2.
- Traduccións poéticas de Antón Losada Diéguez. Ed: Marchisio, C. Bibliófilos Gallegos, 1999, ISBN 84-605-9791-1.
- Na estrada da vida: ensaio de comedia dramática, en tres actos e un prólogo. Fervenza. 2006. ISBN 84-96368-43-2.
- Os que soñan. Fervenza Edicións. A Estrada. 2006. ISBN 84-96368-41-6.
- Virilidade : ensaio cómico, orixinal e en prosa. Fervenza. 2006. ISBN 84-96368-44-0.
- O mellor de... Antón Losada Diéguez (1884-1929), ed. de Teresa Seara, 2010, La Voz de Galicia. ISBN 978-84-9757-257-6.

== Gallery ==
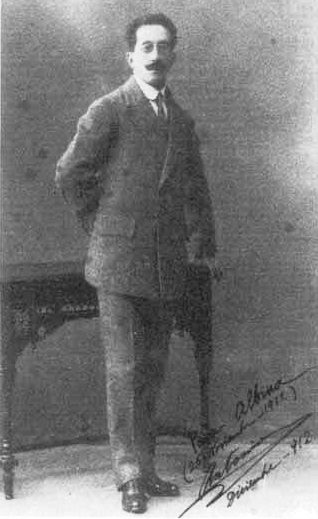
To Albina (November 25, 1912) Antonio.

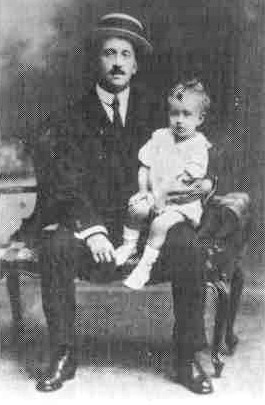
Antón Losada Diéguez with his son Antón, c. 1918.

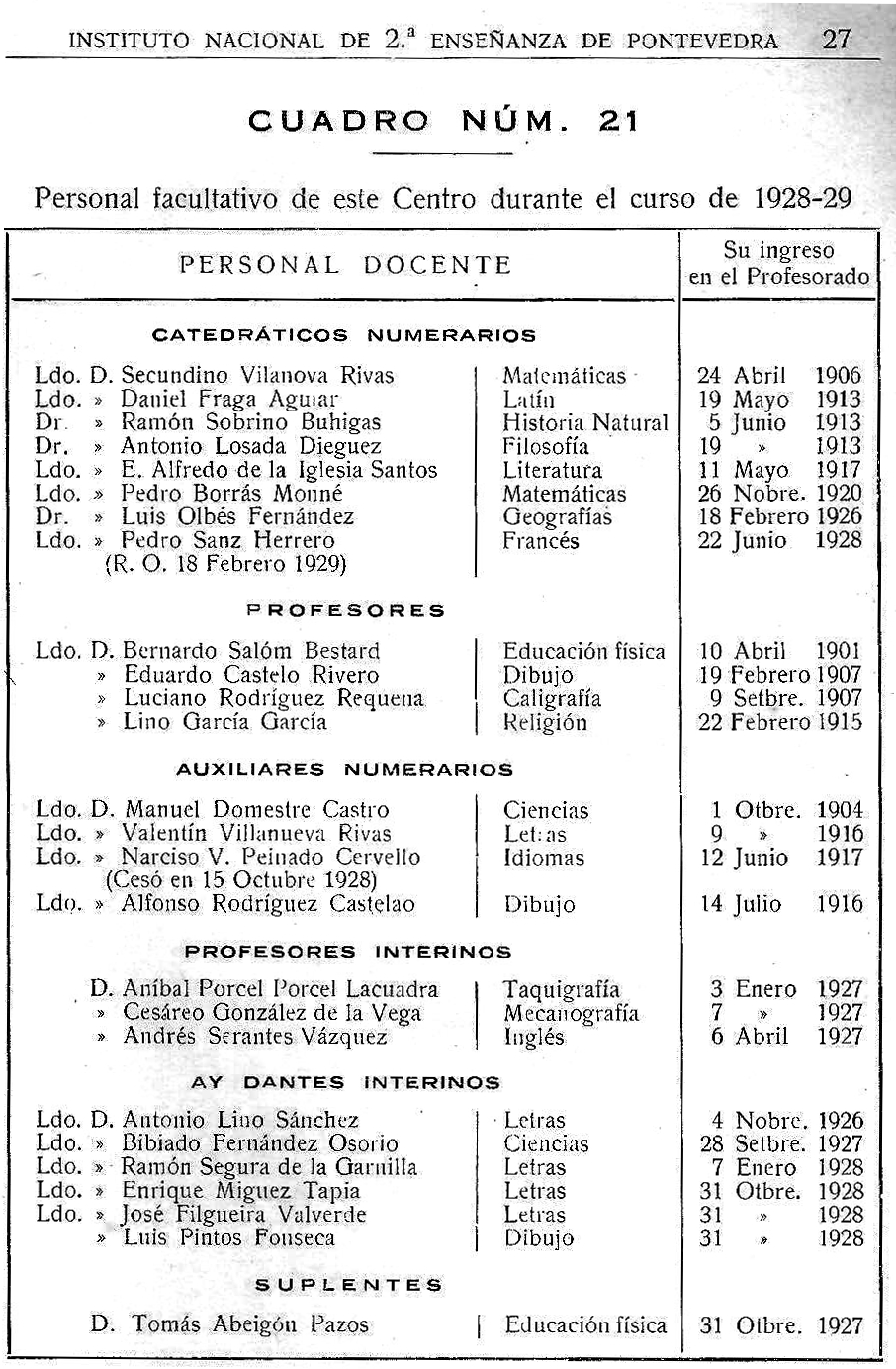
A list of teachers in the Pontevedra High School, year 1928-29.

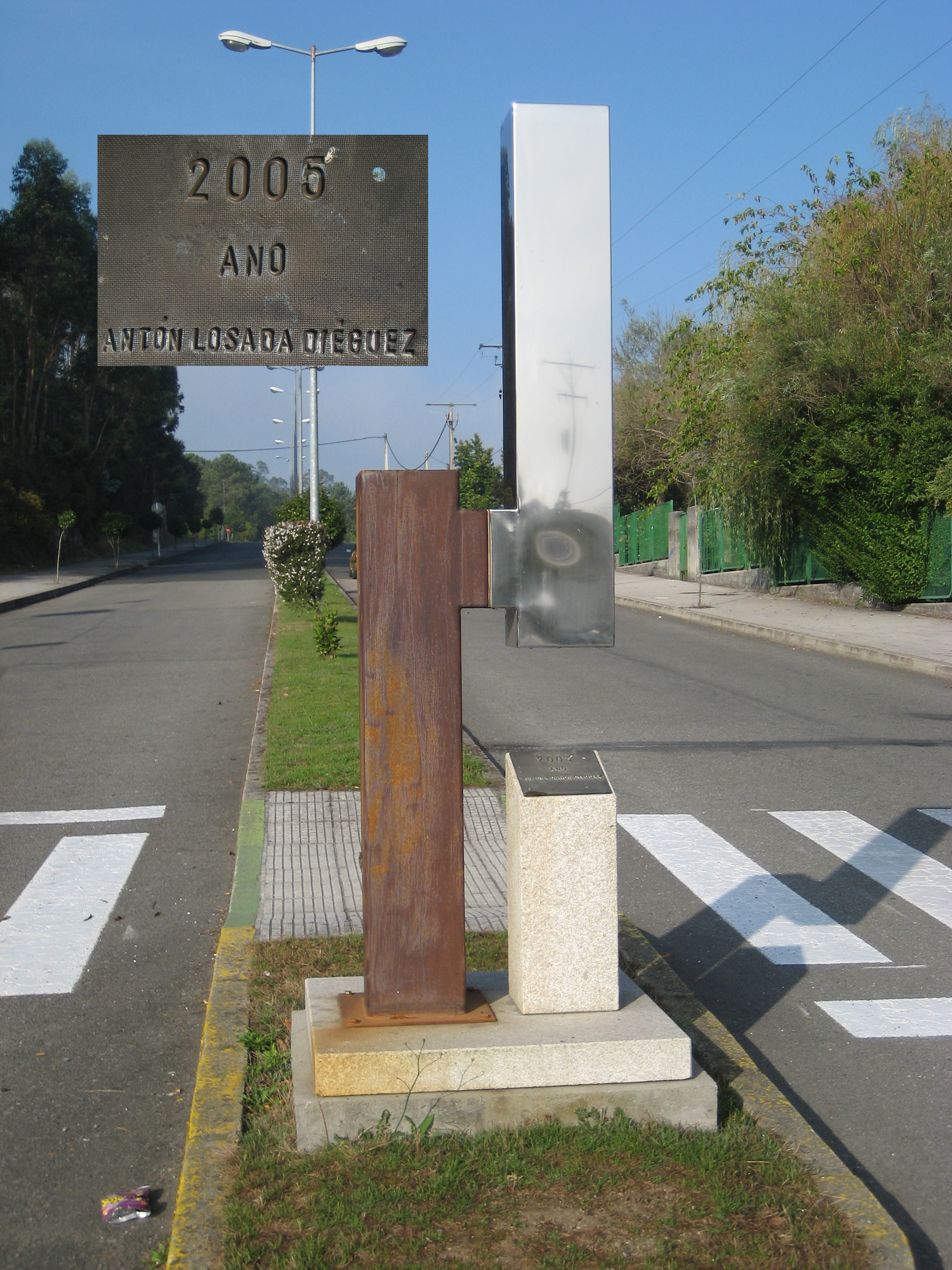
Statue in A Estrada to Losada Diéguez.

== See also ==
- Vicente Risco
- Irmandades da Fala
- José Calvo Sotelo

== Bibliography ==
- José Antonio Durán Iglesias (1981). "Antonio Losada Diéguez, la derecha gallega y los nacionalistas", p. 263-303 in Crónicas-3, Akal, ISBN 9788473395229.
- Xoán Carlos Garrido Couceiro (2005). "Días de Losada na Estrada", intro. in A domeadora, Fervenza, ISBN 978-84-96368-21-7.
- Henrique Monteagudo (1995). "Ideas sobre a lingua de Antón Losada Diéguez" in Antón Losada Diéguez, 10 anos dun premio. O Carballiño. ISBN 978-84-606-2400-4.
- Regueira [in Galician]; Fernando Pérez López; Domingos Antón García e Manuel Aián Díaz (1985). Antón Losada: Teoría e praxe. Asociación Sócio-Pedagóxica Galega.
- Homenaxe a Antón Losada Diéguez: centenario 1884-1984. Concello do Carballiño, 1984. ISBN 84-505-1035-X.

=== External links ===
- RAG. Figures paid tribute to. Antón Losada Diéguez (in Galician)
- Foundation Antón Losada Diéguez (in Galician)
- Galician Virtual Library (in Galician)
- 130 aniversario do nacemento de Antón Losada Diéguez Biblioteca Ánxel Casal, Santiago (in Galician).
