= History of the Galician language =

The history of the Galician language can be summarized as seven centuries of normality and five centuries of conflict. From its origins when it separated from the Galician Latin in the 9th century until the introduction of Castilian in the 16th century there was peace, and from the 16th century until the present there were various conflicts.

== The first inhabitants of Galicia ==
The first inhabitants of Galicia were of pre-indo European origins, and they left a few samples of Galician behind. Thus, pre-indo European words ("amorodo", "lastra", "veiga", etc.), were discovered. Likewise, the first inhabitants of Galicia received certain linguistic and cultural influences of the Celtic peoples in the Iberian Peninsula with words such as ("berce", "bugallo", "croio") that came from the Celtic language in a direct way or through Latin.

== The Romans ==
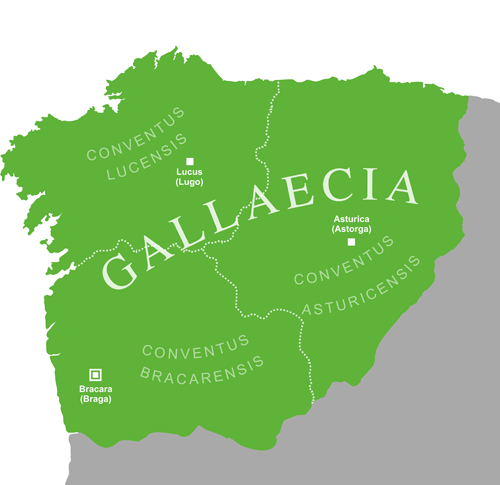
The Galician province under Diocletan.

The Romans arrived in Galicia in the second century BCE, although their conquest was not consolidated until the first century B.C.E., the process of "Romanization" began, which led to the incorporation of indigenous people to the language and the culture of the Roman conquerors. Latin became the language of the area, its assimilation was not an immediate process, but gradual, through the colonization of the Roman citizens and the cultural and administrative advantages of Roman citizenship and distribution of land, among other factors.

The process of Romanization was similar to that of other places, the Romans being able to speak strongly as a romanized elite while the majority of the inhabitants of Galicia use a degraded variant of vulgar Latin, that will result in the creation of the so-called Romance languages: Castilian, Catalan, Romanian, French, and Italian, among others.

== The arrival of the Germanic Tribes ==
From the 5th century C.E. people of Germanic culture and language came to Galicia, but due to their small demographic weight they were unable to fully assimilate into the Galician-Roman population, which ended their assimilation. Also during the High Middle Ages, refugees coming from the Britannic Islands arrived and the zone was even occupied briefly by the Arabians during the eighth century. Even though its cultural significance is insignificant compared to the background of Latin culture, these people provide various loanwords with several Germanic (alberca, espeto, roupa, etc.) and Arabic terms (often through indirect sources)(laranxa, aceite, azucre, etc.,).

== The formation of Galician ==
The transformation of Latin into Galician occurred in a progressive and unnoticeable form. It is impossible to provide an exact date of transformation. But from the preserved written testimonies it can be said that from the eighth century the language of the church and the administration was very different than classic Latin, although it often appears full of vulgarisms and idioms that will later be transmitted to Galician.

However, the first writings in a language considered similar to Galician do not appear until well into the twelfth century and Latin continues to be the language of the culture, the administration, the liturgy and of teaching, not only in the territory of old Gallaecia but in a majority of Medieval Europe.

The oldest literary document that is currently preserved is a satiric song Ora faz ost'o senhor de Navarra by Joam Soares of Paiva, written sometime close to the year 1200. The first non-literary documents in Galician date from the beginnings of the thirteenth century; for example, the "News of Torto" (1211) and the Testament of Alfonso II of Portugal (1214). Recently the oldest document written in Galician was found, dated to the year 1228. It came from a meeting in the town of Castro Caldelas, granted by Alfonso IX in April of the year of the municipality of Allariz. The oldest document of Latin-Galician-Portuguese was found in Portugal and was a donation to the Church of Sozello, which was found in the National Archives of Torre of Tombo and is dated around the year 870 C.E.

Since the 8th century, and as the Muslim invaders consolidated their conquests in the south of the Iberian Peninsula, Galicia constituted a political unit with the medieval rulers of Asturias and León, although it maintained certain autonomy that allowed it to on occasion emerge as an independent kingdom in certain moments of the 10th, 11th, and 12th centuries. In this context Galician is, for the most part, an exclusively oral language, with a decreasing competition with Latin in the written field. The progressive demographic weight of the Galician speakers little by little introduced Galician together with Latin in notarial documents, administrative documents, lawsuits, etc. even though Latin continues to possess a superior cultural position.

== Medieval splendor ==
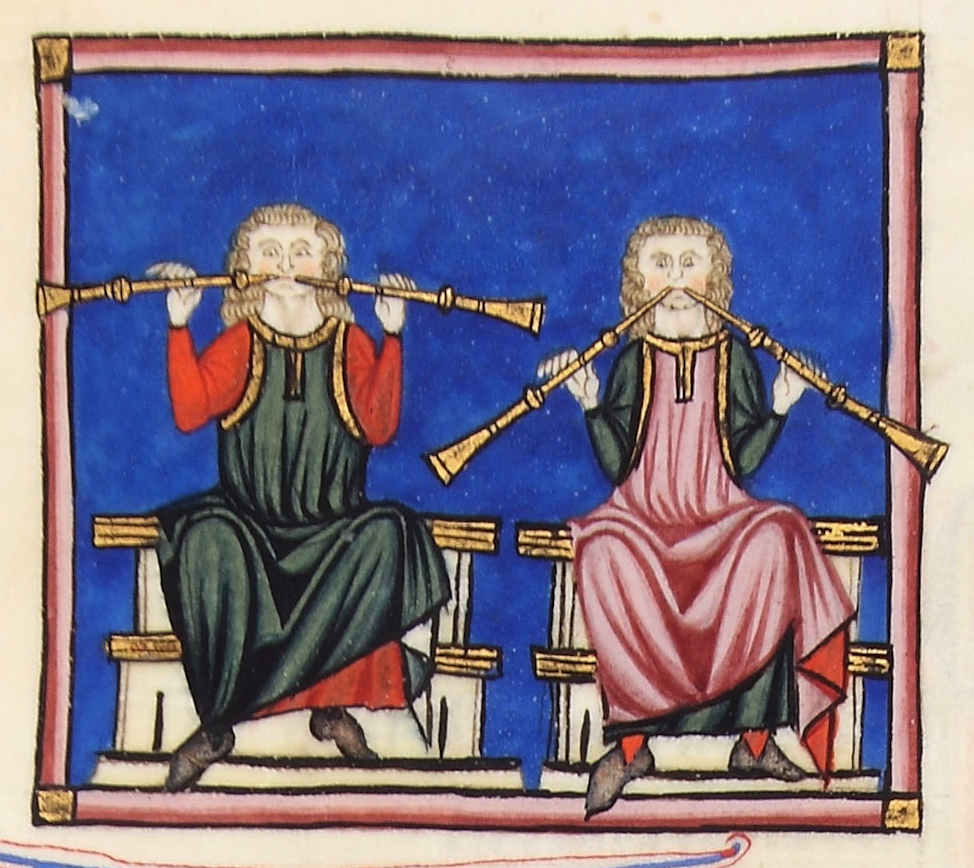
Miniature of the Cantigas of Santa María

From the 14th century and from its unification, Galician literature lives its period of its greatest splendor. Galician became the language par excellence of Lyric poetry.

In this period Galician attained an international rank, since it was being used by authors of many European languages: Galician, Portuguese, Leonese, Castilian, Occitan, Sicilian, etc. and was present in royal and stately courts, although its use was concentrated mostly in the Iberian Peninsula.

The "Songs of Santa María," poetic compositions performed in praise of the Virgin Mary, are the main display of the religious aspect of the Galician-Portuguese lyric poetry and constitute the body of the most important medieval Marian poetry in all of the Iberian Peninsula and across Europe. They were composed in the court of King Alfonso X "the wise man" of Castile, who was in charge of the management of the poetry and on occasion participated directly in its composition. These are examples of the prestige gained by Galician as a literary language by the end of the thirteenth century. The splendor spans not only the kingdom of Castile, but also the neighboring kingdom, where the king himself, Dionsio I of Portugal, was a prominent composer of Galician-Portuguese lyric poetry.

In comparison with lyric poetry, the medieval literary prose in Galician is scarce and belated. It is necessary to keep in mind that the central cultures of the period, the monasteries and the monastic schools, were where the use of ecclesiastical Latin prevailed. Nevertheless, from the end of the thirteenth century and more significantly in the fourteenth through fifteenth centuries, the most widely disseminated literary themes in Europe were collected in the Galician language. Various examples are the stories of the so-called "Breton Cycle" around the legendary figure of King Arthur, the texts regarding the history and destruction of Troy, such as the "Trojan History" and the "Trojan Chronicle" and the "Miracles of Santiago", sets of stories about the destruction of Jerusalem to the miracle intervention of Saint James the Apostle in different situations. Also it is necessary to include other texts in prose that are translations or versions of other languages with their own elaboration, such as the "Galician Chronicle Xeral", "General Estoria", "Galician Chronicle of 1404" and "The Chronicle of Santa Maria of Iria".

== The dark centuries ==
The end of the Middle Ages (fourteenth-fifteenth centuries) coincides with the end of the splendor of the Galician language and the beginning of the progressive period of decline, both in the common and literary use of the language.

Several factors influenced this progressive decline, especially the progressive centralization of the kingdom of Castile and the subsequent consolidation of absolutism. Also important is the settlement in Galicia of a foreign nobility outside of the Galician culture and language, that replaced the native nobility that was defeated on several occasions in the succession and dynastic struggles of the crown of Castile. First in the war between Pedro I "The Cruel" and Enrique II of Trastámara and later (1475–1479) in the war between Juana the Beltraneja and Isabel the Catholic; the absence of a strong bourgeoisie capable of defending its interests, the decline of the population, the reform of the church, and the loss of autonomy of the Galician Church, etc.

These facts, together with the growing centralist and interventionist policy of Castile, progressively strengthen the current "de-galicianizing" movement, especially in the upper classes of society, which prevents the consolidation of Galician as a cultured and literary language. This process is aggravated by the formation of modern states and the appearance of the concept of the "nation-state", which entails a linguistic uniformity and administration as a factor of cohesion of political structures.

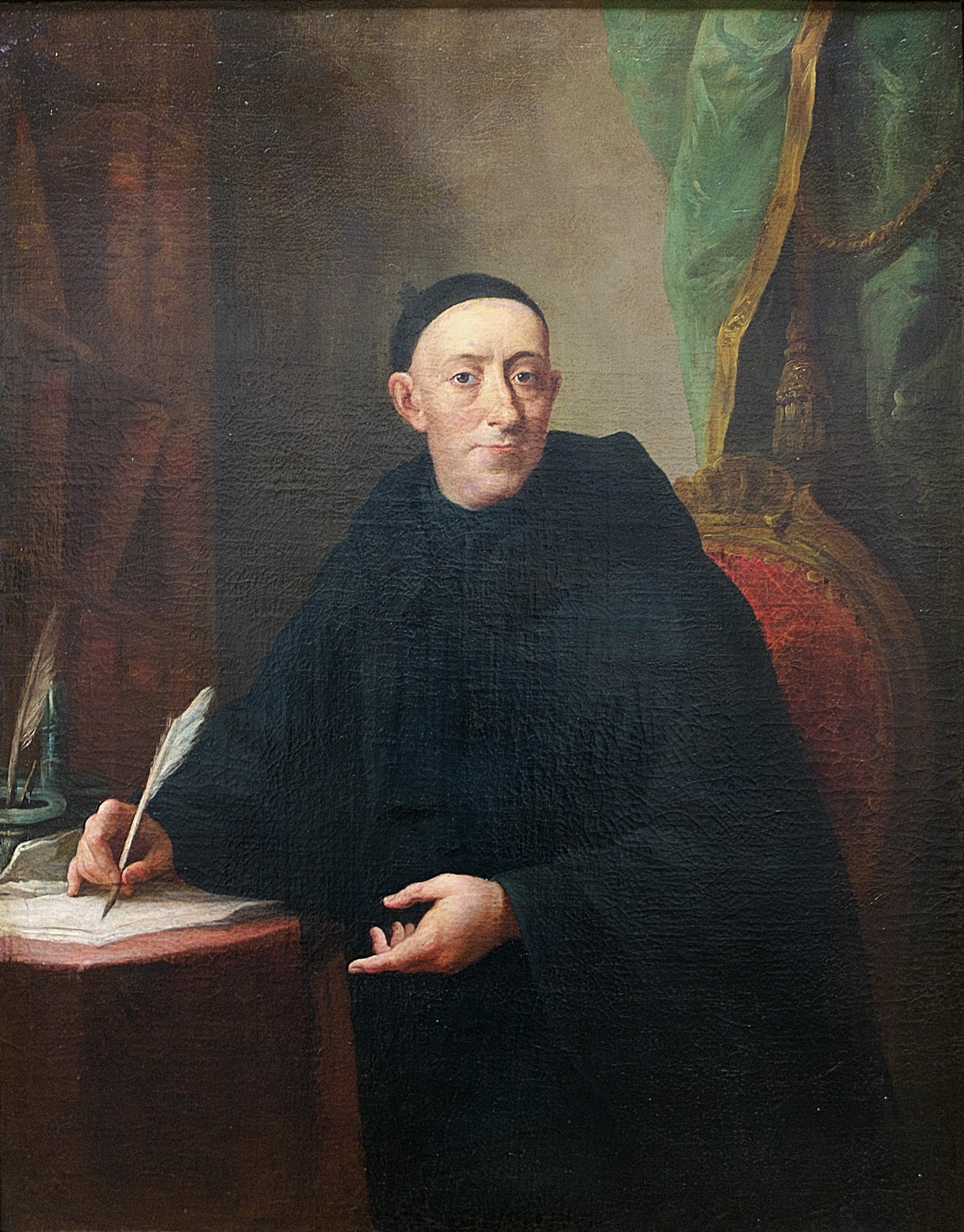
The illustrated Friar Benito Jerónimo Feijoo claimed the recognition of the Galician language.

During a long period of three centuries (the sixteenth, seventeenth and eighteenth) denominated the "dark centuries," the Galician language, compared to Castilian and Portuguese, was practically absent from written works in the Iberian Peninsula and during this period began a process of codification and grammatical and spelling fixation that gives a category of cultural languages. In addition, their use extends over the entire population of the states of Spain and Portugal, respectively. In contrast, the exclusively oral use of the language has led to a progressive dialectalization and fragmentation of the language, disabling its literary and scientific use.

In this way the Galician language was left out of the literary trends of the Renaissance and Baroque, which coincide with the so-called "Golden Age" of Castilian literature. There are, however, scarce written testimonies (such as letters addressed to Diego Sarmiento of Acuña, count of Gondomar), documents and a few literary samples that allow us to appreciate the situation of the language at the time. Parallel to the space in scholarly literature, a popular poem survives in lullabies, blind songs, carnival songs, riddles, legends, romances, tales, farces, etc. Many of these literary expressions survived until today through oral transmission. In the eighteenth century, some voices of denunciation of the so-called "enlightened" arose that showed their concern for the underdevelopment of Galicia and offered renewing proposals for economic, social and cultural life. Among this minority group of intellectuals, the figure of Father Martín Sarmiento forcefully stands out, a versatile character-naturalist, linguist, and book lover who defended the use of Galician in teaching, administration and the church, that is, its normalization as the language of the Galicians. Also participating were Father Benito Jerónimo Feijoo, the first scholar to reject the status of the "dialect" of Galician and Father Sobreira, who continued the lexicographical work of Sarmiento. His work constituted the first call of attention to the linguistic problem that will manifest itself in its entirety starting in the second half of nineteenth century.

== The Resurgence ==
"Rexurdimento" (Resurgence) is the name by which the nineteenth century is known in the history of Galician language and expresses a clear path of recovery, not only literary, but also cultural, political and historical.

Since the French invasion and the War of Independence in 1809, and later among the clashes between absolutists and liberals in the whole of Spain, texts written in Galician arose, in loose sheets or journals used for propaganda. Some called the peasants to defend the country, others defended liberal ideas.

Throughout the century, after the end of absolutism and the start of a constitutional monarchy, various Galician movements were born, based in the defense of the uniqueness of the different personalities of Galicia. The first of them, emerged around the decade of the 1840s is called "Provincialism", which denounced the social marginalization of Galicia and looked for a social revaluation of its art, customs and history.

The provincials were separated from politics after their support for the failed military uprising of Miguel Solís and the execution of the Martyrs of Carral, and the survivors and followers of this movement were limited in the cultural and literary world.

The second Galician generation gave rise to the movement of "Regionalism" that combined culture and politics, making the Galician language their primary concern.

On the road to linguistic and literary recovery, the first Floral Games were celebrated in the city of Coruña in 1861. Award-winning compositions, together with samples of contemporary poetry, were collected a year later in the "Charity Album", the first anthology of the Galician Resurgence.

The first Galician book published in the nineteenth century is "The Galician Bagpipe" by Xoan Manuel Pintos in 1852, but the publication of "Galician Songs" in 1863, the work of the renowned poet Rosalía de Castro is the work that definitively opens the Resurgence. 1880 was also a fruitful year for publications in Galician, compositions from the most famous poets of the era appeared: "Follas Novas" by Rosalía de Castro,"Aires da miña terra" by Manuel Curros Enríquez, and "Saudades gallegas" by Valentín Lamas Carvajal. Six years later "Queixumes dos pinos" by Eduardo Pondal appeared.

The quality of the work by Rosalía de Castro transcends the borders of Galician and with her publications in Castilian "In the shores of Sar" she also becomes a prominent poet in the Castilian language and in universal literature. Her verses have been the subject of many studies and have been translated into many diverse languages.

Manuel Curros Enríquez is one of the most popular Galician writers of his time. No doubt because of his poetry denouncing the injustices of Galician society (forums, oppression, emigration...) and defending progressive ideas. He established a tradition of combative poetry that numerous Galician authors would continue (Ramón Cabanillas, Celso Emilio Ferreiro, etc.).

Eduardo Pondal, author of "Queixumes dos pinos" (which was adapted and converted into a Galician hymn), investigates the prehistoric roots of Galicia, highlighting the Celtic element and creating a poem to enhance the individuality of the Galician language. He tried to reinforce the language as a literary and cultural language.

These and other authors broadened the literary boundaries of the Galician language, which was spread by lyric, narrative, essay and didactic prose.

The consolidation of Galician prose does not happen until the twentieth century, but at the end of the nineteenth century some important precedents already existed. Such as "Máxima ou a filla espúrea" (1880) by Marcial Valladares, the first contemporary Galician novel. A work that was widespread among the working class "O catecimos do labrego" by Valentín Lamas Carvajal. "A tecederia de Bonaval", "Castelo de Hambre" and "O niño de Pombas" made Antonio López Ferreiro the best prose writer of the time.

The theater was the least cultivated genre. Since the publication of "A Casamenteira" in 1812 until the decade of the 1880s no theater-related writings were published.

Also in the last decades of the nineteenth century the first grammatical rules and dictionaries of the Galician language emerged. Essential for its normalization, among those that stand out, the "Compendio de gramática gallega-castellana" (1864) by Francisco Mirás, and "Gramática Gallega" by Saco and Arce, a scholarly study of the Galician language.

The presence of the Galician language in journalism contributed enormously to its prestige. In the year 1876 "O Tío Marcos da Portela" is published, edited and promoted by Valentín Lamas Carvajal, the pioneer of newspapers written entirely in Galician. The success of this newspaper, which was marked with a nature of tyranny, was spectacular. Between the years 1886 and 1888 journalism in Galicia was gradually consolidated, with the appearance of new monolingual initiatives: “O Galiciano” in Pontevedra; "A Monteira" in Lugo; and "As Burgas" in Ourense.

One of the last demonstrations of the Resurgence, already in the 20th century, was the constitution of the Royal Galician Academy in 1905.

== The Twentieth Century ==
=== The Start of the Twentieth Century ===
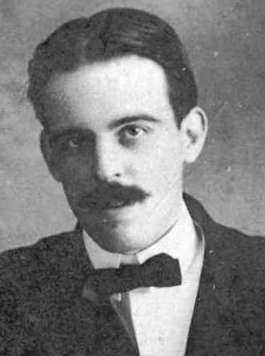
A. Vilar Ponte was an important member of the Irmandades of Fala.

At the end of the nineteenth century, the recovery of Galician as a literary, historical and cultural language was confirmed; in addition, a decrease in the level of oral use became obvious, in a large part due to the consolidation of teaching in Castilian. The Galician language had not yet reached a normalized situation, which caused a social setback in the upper and middle classes, especially in urban environments.

The socio-political activity contrasts with the prolific cultural activity. The Galician society of the early twentieth century is still characterized by the concentration of economic power in sections of minority, with an agricultural system in which medieval influences remained and with a growing emigration that demographically emptied the country. Agrarian associations rose that channeled social protests and had powerful resonance among the peasants; this was the case of the Agrarian League of Galician Action. The awareness of the peasantry, encouraged by the access to land ownership, together with the progressive evolution of Galicians towards nationalism, provoked a qualitative jump in the utilization of the Galician language. Nationalism was linked to language as the essence of collective identity, whose first manifestations were the "Irmandades da Fala". These associations, created for the defense, dignity, and cultivation of the language, arose first in Coruña in 1916. They were followed by other main cities and villages of Galicia, Ferrol, Ourense, Betanzoa, Santiago de Compostela, etc. For the diffusion of their ideas, they created a newspaper of expression, completely in Galician: "A Nosa Terra". Its most outstanding members were the brothers Villar Ponte, Antonio Losada Diéguez, Vicente Risco, and Ramón Cabanillas.

In 1918 the "First Galician Nationalist Assembly" was held, which demanded the full integral autonomy of Galicia and the inclusion of Galicia in the League of Nations in Geneva. The Irmandades promoted the elaboration of dictionaries and grammatical books, linguistics studied and reclaimed the presence of Galician in administration and teaching. They promoted publishing activity in the main cities of Galicia, Celtic in Ferrol, Lar in Coruña, Alborada in Ponteverda and many others, as well as frequent sections in Galician in the Castilian press. In this context, the magazine "Nós" by Vicente Risco appears, Ramón Otero Pedrayo and Florentino Cuevillas, that formed the so-called "Grupo Nós". The figure of Alfonso Daniel Rodríguez Castelao will later be linked to them.

=== 1920 and 1930 ===
The members of "Nós", with a wide and diverse intellectual formation, set its goal of eliminating the burden of nineteenth-century folklore in Galician culture through its updating, normalization and universalization of literary, artistic and scientific trends of the period. The journal "Nós" counted on the collaboration of diverse authors (Portuguese, Irish, Catalans, French...), that supported different European perspectives, in addition to the translation of various articles of scientific—archaeological, anthropological, sociological—and literary nature.

The use of Galician in scientific studies was promoted by the creation of "Seminar of Galician Studies" (1923) dedicated to investigations about Galician reality in all of its manifestations. It was founded by a group of young university students: Fermín Bouza Brey, Filgueira Valverde, Lois Tobío...which others soon joined, such as Ricardo Carvalho Calero, Antonio Fraguas, or Xaquín Lorenzo.

The literary work of these intellectuals, who covered fields like the essay, opened new horizons that provided Galician prose with a comprehensive development of the Galician language in European contexts. "Arredor de si", "Devalar" or "Os camiños da vida" by Ramón Otero Pedrayo and "Os europeos en Abrantes" and "O porco de pé" by Vicente Risco, are titles that incorporated Galician literature into universal, legendary themes and exotic, urban and philosophical thoughts of new creative techniques that were being developed in European literature.

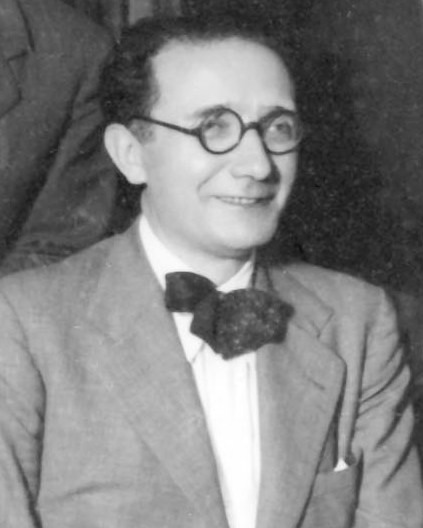
Castelao, One of the craftsmen of the first Statute of Galicia.

The weak tradition of the dramatic genre received some momentum with the creation of the Irmandades of Fala of the National Conservatory of Galician Art in 1919, that would later become the Galician School of Drama.

The avant-garde European movements were not oblivious to Galician verse. The authors of the so-called "Generation of 25"-Manuel Antonio, Luis Amado Carballo, Fermín Bouza Brey-demonstrated a great will for creative originality based on the confrontation of the traditional forms of poetry.

The versatile figure of Castelao deserves mention. A classic in Galician literature, he manifested his art in diverse areas: novel, theater, short narrative and political essay as well as in the field of drawing. "Always in Galiza”, the ultimate work of Galician nationalism, and other works jointly reflect his capacity as an artist and a writer. Castelao entails a great political significance embodied in his essay works and in his active and direct participation in the politics of Spain (he was the Deputy of the Republic in the ranks of the Galician Party).

The Galician Party was created in 1931, and it got the approval of the first Statute of Autonomy of Galicia, in which the Galician language first acquired its recognition as the "official language of Galicia". This important achievement did not have a practical implication in reality because of the outbreak of the Spanish Civil War (1936), which marked the beginning of the most difficult period for the unofficial languages of Spain.

=== From 1936 to 1950 ===
The end of the Spanish Civil War and the beginning of Franco's dictatorship brought about the disappearance of the Galician language from the public scene, as well as teaching and social economic activities. Many Galician intellectuals—Castelao, Eduardo Blanco Amor, Luis Seoane, Rafael Dieste—had to go into exile, but they maintained the culture and identity of Galicia while in exile. The cultural development of Galician was revived in the setting of emigration and exile in Argentina, Venezuela, Mexico and Cuba, among other countries.

The social situation of the Galician language was worsened with the enforcement of obligatory schooling from a basic level and later with the popularization of media coverage, which used Castilian as its only vehicle of expression.

In this adverse context Galician autonomy did not disappear completely, but rather, as Franco's dictatorship softened its measures of repression, it timidly began to manifest itself in the cultural environment, albeit dissociated from the politics of the previous period. In 1947, four works of poetry were published in Galician. Several decisive elements were the collection of Benito Soto poetry, the publishing house of Galician Bibliophiles and the weekly bilingual edition of the cosmopolitan newspaper "The Night".

The key piece in the recovery of the written use of Galician was the creation of the Editorial Galaxia in 1950. Its main promoters, Ramón Otero Pedrayo, Francisco Fernández of Riego and others, once again demonstrated the validity of the Galician language for any genre or theme. Galacia became the centerpiece of several published periodicals: "The Economic Magazine of Galicia", the magazine of culture and art "Atlántida" and the journal of thought "Grial," were prohibited one year following its emergence.

=== The 1960s ===
Beginning in 1960 a set of changes in the economic and social environment of Galician occurred that were accompanied by the lessening of censorship from Franco.

Examples of this openness of the regime were the possibility of the appearance of previously prohibited publications like "Grial", the celebration of "The Day of the Galician Letters" promoted by the Royal Galician Academy, the expansion of the publishing world with "Castro Publications", as well as the rise of new cultural associations in defense of the Galician language, such as "O Facho", "O Galo", and the cultural association of Vigo. The Galician University was not left out of these concerns and took an active part in the creation of the Chair of Galician Language and Literature in 1965 headed by Ricardo Carvalho Calero. Six years later the Galician Institute of Language was born, with developed research work until today.

The literary production of Galician, parallel to the rest of Spain, resumed a solid production. Once again the lyric poetry was responsible for the start of the literary revival. "Longa noite de pedra" (1962), by Celso Emilio Ferreiro, represents the social and civic line characterized by Galician poetry in the decade of the 1960s. Lueiro Rey, Bernardino Graña and Manuel María are some of the authors of poetry that tried to combine the political discourse with the literary.

Galician narrative suffers a gap from 1936 to 1951, the year that Ricardo Caravalho Calero published his first novel, "The People of Barreira". Between the decades of 1950 and 1960 three great authors emerge, Álvaro Cunqueiro, Eduardo Blanco Amor and Ánxel Fole, who from their particular narrative forms created a work of universally recognized quality.

Other authors of the 1960s are Gonzalo Mourullo, Méndez Ferrín, they echo the literary innovations of the European narrative, constituting the so-called "New Narrative", a renewing and revitalizing movement of Galician prose.

=== 1970 and 1980 ===
The establishment of democracy as of 1975, after the death of the dictator Francisco Franco, allowed the consolidation of the previous genres and the opening of new horizons in different literary fields in response to the demands of a free society. Galicia went from being a land that primarily produced poetry to interesting and involving more people in literature, producing books, political chronicles, and reviews, as well as diverse types of Essays: sociolinguistic and literary (Basilio Losada, Francisco Pillado), theological and religious (Andrés Torres Queiruga, Chao Rego), philosophical (Martínez Marzoa), and historical (Ramón Villares, Felipe Senén, Xosé Ramón Barreiro).

In narrative, the tendencies diversified and the authors who began to make themselves known before 1975 (like María Xosé Queizán, Alfredo Conde, Paco Martín, etc.) united in a very heterogeneous collection of writers (Víctor Freixanes, Xavier Alcalá, Carlos González Reigosa, Suso de Toro, Manuel Rivas, Fernández Paz) that amplified the narrative types: historical, political, erotic, realistic, etc.

There are also editions of books that arose aimed at younger readers in children's collections (Merlín, Sotelo Blanco Infantil, etc.) and collections for young readers (Xabarín, Doce por Vintedous, Fóra de Xogo, Gaivota, Árbore, etc.), which constituted a large contribution to the normalization of Galician literature.

Poetry was also renewed. Méndez Ferrín and Arcadio López Casanova, with the appearance of their poetry in 1976, marked a richer direction more open to multiple influences. Darío Xohán Cabana, Xulio Valcárcel, Rodríguez Fer, Manuel Rivas and many other authors contributed and continue to contribute to the enlargement of a genre established from the beginning of literature in the Galician language in the Middle Ages.

The dramatic genre experienced an intense transformation in the second half of the twentieth century. The work of authors of the immediate post-war period, like Álvaro Cunqueiro or Ricardo Carvalho Calero, coexisted with the work of the new, such as Manuel María, Vidal Bolaño, or Manuel Lourenzo, who sought a formal break with the old tendencies. They all opened the theatrical world to the tendencies of the novel. The emergence at the end of the 1960s and the beginning of the 1970s of the phenomenon of the Independent Theater Groups (e.g., O Facho, Teatro Circo) stands out. In these years, associations are spreading that attempt to strengthen the theater, especially by approaching young audiences.

In the year 1978, Galicia, like the rest of Spain, once again had a democratic constitution which in its articles proclaims it "will protect all of the Spaniards and the people of Spain in the exercise of human rights, their cultures and traditions, languages and institutions", while at the same time laying the foundation for a new legal-political configuration: The Autonomous State. With the democratic regime, Galicia converted to an autonomous community, taking Galician and Castilian as its official languages, although the constitution marks the right and duty to know Castilian to all citizens it only gave the duty to know Galician to Galician citizens.

In parallel with legislation regulating the uses of the language, came the creation of a standard language beyond different dialects. The Institute of Galician Language, created in 1971, and the Royal Galician Academy proposed the "Orthographic and morphological norms of the Galician language" in 1982, which reached an official status with the enactment of the "Law of Linguistic Normalization." The recent revising and updating of these norms, which incorporated some reintegration positions, is from the year 2003.

In the year 1985 the Television of Galicia and Radio Galicia arose. The first was (and is) a fundamental channel to maintain the presence of the Galician language in audio-visual media communications and contributed to its normalization in this area that up until then was quite unsatisfied. As far as Radio Galicia was concerned, it also had the merit of maintaining a monolingual radio channel of quality and with interest in its own culture. Galician Television especially addressed topics and fought prejudices, showing people of diverse nationalities and times speaking in Galician.

== The 21st century ==
In the beginning of the 21st century the Galician language remained alive, protected by the current legislation and its high number of speakers, yet it still faces challenges.

From the current studies of the Galician social-linguistics, an improvement is observed regarding the attitude and perception of Galician, most importantly in reading ability. However, at the level of a vehicular or habitual language, and also as a native language, the Galician language is currently losing speakers, so that in recent generations there are more Castilian speakers than Galician speakers. This data is confirmed, for example, among other sources in a report of the School Council of Galicia which notes that only 30% of the students in primary school use the Galician language (data from the courses 2002–2003, 2003–2004 and 2004–2005). For this reason it seemed necessary to have greater government involvement and in the year 2007 the Galician Parliament made a deal for the creation of a new agreement that guaranteed they would be able to reach a minimum of 50% of the teaching in Galician; this goal was also promoted by the creation of the Galician pre-schools, and nursery schools in which they use Galician as the vehicular language.

According to a report from October 2007 from the Sociolinguistic Seminar of the Royal Galician Academy, only 20.6% of children have their initial language as Galician. In 1992 the same seminar estimated this datum to be 60.3%. In the cities the results are worse; it is estimated that only 1.6% of those from Ferrol and 4.3% of those from Vigo have Galician as their initial language, while in Coruña it is 6.3%, in Ourense 9.1%, in Pontevedra 9.4%, in Lugo 17.9% and in Santiago 18.4%.
