= Castrapo =

Pejorative term for Galician-influenced Spanish

Castrapo (a portmanteau of castelán and trapo, meaning rag) is a term used in the region of Galicia to refer to a local variety of the Castilian language that uses a lot of code-switching, vocabulary, syntax and expressions directly from the Galician language although they do not exist or have equivalents in Standard Castilian. This way of speaking is mainly prevalent in the densely populated urban areas of Galicia and is sometimes stereotyped as "the way Galician politicians speak".

== Origin ==
The phenomenon of Castrapo traces back its origins to the imposition of the Castilian language in Galicia and the attempted Castilianization of the region after it was absorbed by the Kingdom of Castile (also known as the Doma y castración del Reino de Galicia; "Domination and castration of the Kingdom of Galicia" by Galicianist authors such as Castelao). The Galician language lost its officiality during the era known as the Seculos Escuros (Dark Centuries), and it was no longer studied at schools, used by religious organizations or any administrative entity. It became a de-facto spoken language by the Galician people and its use was reduced to family situations and private life although it has always stayed the most commonly-spoken language in Galicia.

Some Galicianist intellectuals like Manuel María viewed Castrapo as a threat to the Galician language by Castilianization.

== Definition and usage ==
The standard Galician dictionary published by the Royal Galician Academy defines it as a "variation of the Castilian language, distinguished by the abundance of words and expressions taken from Galician language".

Some Galician reintegrationist groups, which advocate for the unity of Galician-Portuguese as a modern single language, may also use the word Castrapo to refer disapprovingly to the current standard form of Galician that is regulated by the Royal Galician Academy, which they consider to be too influenced by Castilian and artificially distanced from modern Portuguese.

== Examples ==
The phrase Close the window would be Pecha a ventana. In Standard Castilian, it would be Cierra la ventana; in Galician, it would be Pecha a fiestra/ventá/xanela; and in Portuguese, it would be Fecha a janela.

== Phonology ==
Final unstressed /e/ and /o/ are frequently raised to [i] and [u] in the Castilian that is spoken in rural Galicia.

== See also ==
- Castilianization
- Castúo
- Linguistic features of Spanish as spoken by Catalan speakers
- Llanito

== Bibliography ==
- Lipski, John (2012). "Geographical and Social Varieties of Spanish: An Overview" (PDF). In Hualde, José Ignacio; Olarrea, Antxon; O'Rourke, Erin (eds.). The Handbook of Hispanic Linguistics. Blackwell Publishing Ltd. pp. 1–26. doi:10.1002/9781118228098.ch1. ISBN 9781405198820. Archived from the original (PDF) on 2024-09-19.
