= Xosé Filgueira Valverde =

Spanish writer and intellectual

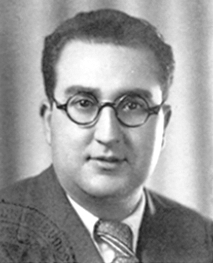
- Valverde in 1931
- Born: Xosé Fernando Filgueira Valverde; 28 November 1906; Pontevedra, Galicia, Spain
- Died: 13 September 1996 (aged 89); Pontevedra, Galicia, Spain
- Occupations: Writer and researcher
- Writing career
- Language: Galician

Xosé Fernando Filgueira Valverde, or sometimes José Filgueira Valverde (28 October 1906, in Pontevedra – 13 September 1996, in Pontevedra), was a Spanish writer, intellectual, researcher, scholar and critic in Galician language and Spanish. He was known as "O vello profesor" ("The old professor") to Galician intellectuals.

Xosé co-founded the Seminario de Estudos Galegos, along with Fermín Bouza Brey and Lois Tobío Fernández, and was director of the Instituto Padre Sarmiento de Estudios Gallegos and the Museo de Pontevedra. He chaired the Consejo de la Cultura Gallega and was a member of the Royal Galician Academy. With a deep interest in humanist culture, Filgueira Valverde completed extensive and informative work in a period in which this function was nonexistent or unfulfilled by institutions.

The Royal Galician Academy agreed to dedicate the 2015, Day of the Galician Letters, to Filgueira Valverde for his work in favour of the Galician language and culture. He is a figure that arouses controversy and yet played a fundamental role in the recounting of the Galician culture and literature of the 20th century.
