= Via XVIII =

Roman road

Via Nova, Via XVIII, Geira
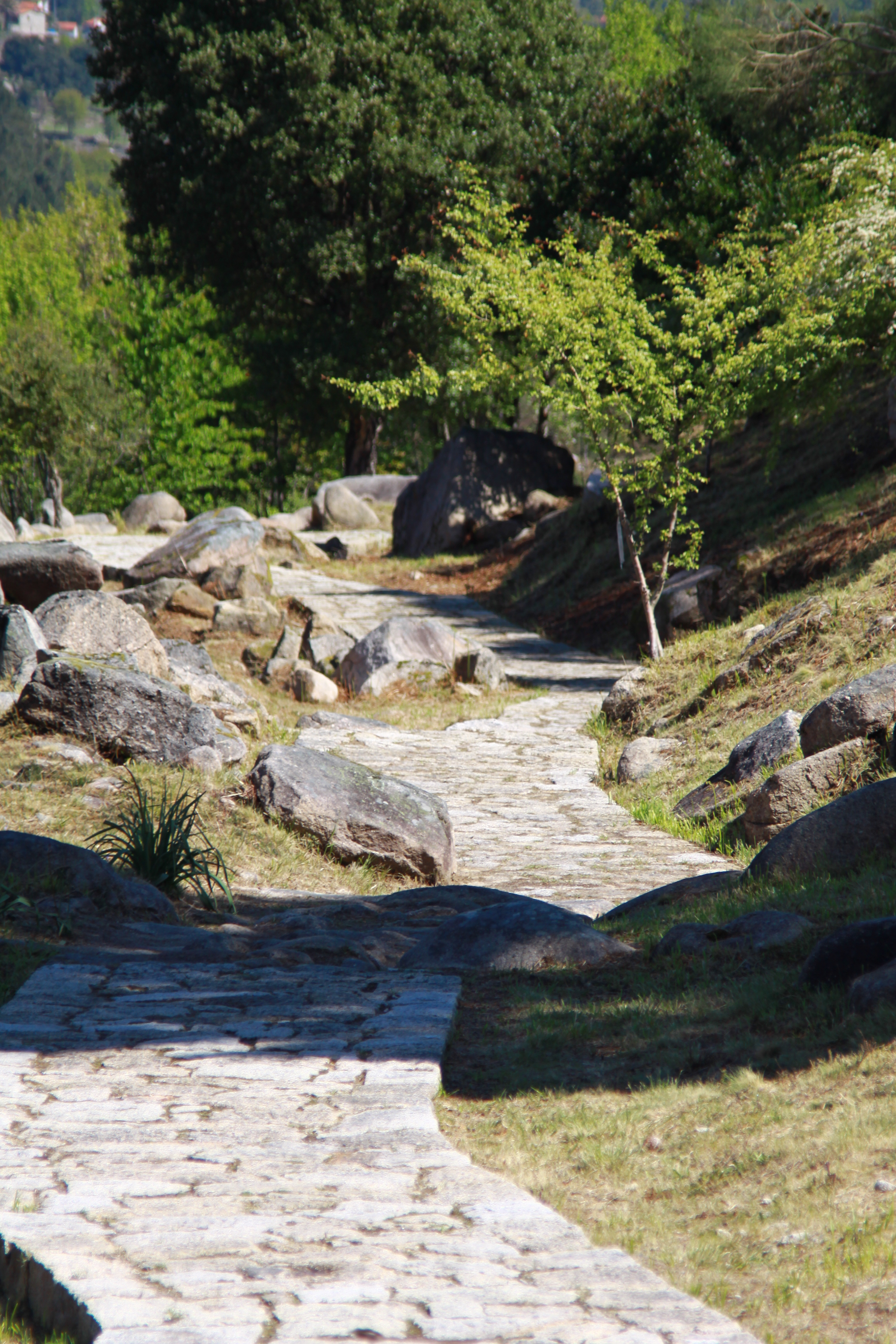
- Via XVIII near A Pontenova, Lobios

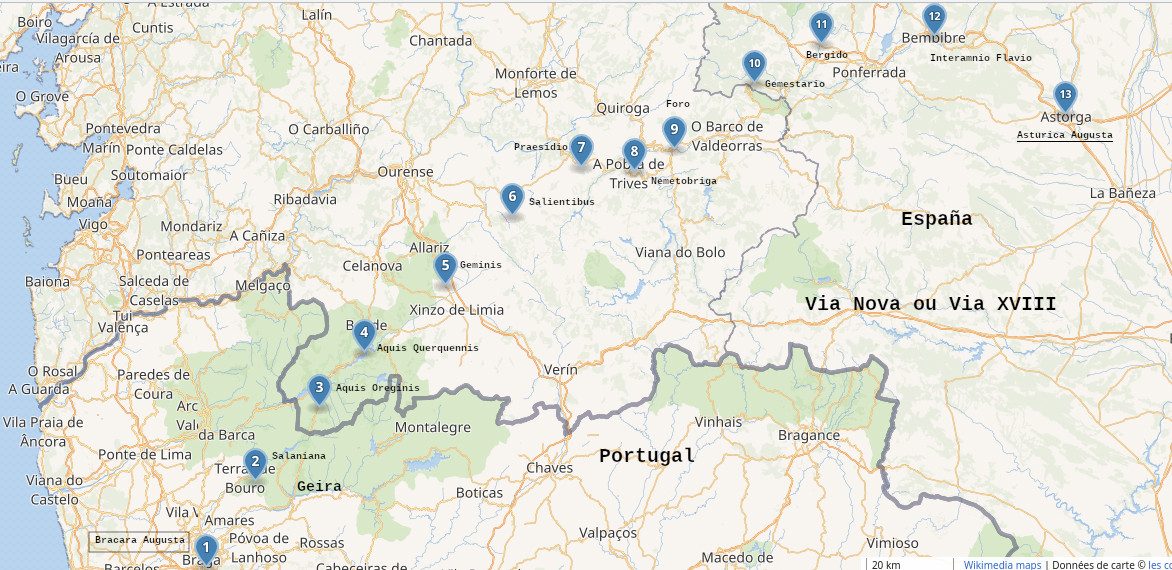
- Type: Roman road
- Periods: 79 BC - 80 BC
- Location: Roman province of Hispania from Bracara Augusta (Braga) to Asturica Augusta (Astorga)

History
- Built by: Roman Empire, Vespasian and Titus

The Via Nova or Via XVIII in the Antonine Itinerary (also known as Geira) is a Roman road which linked the cities of Bracara Augusta (current Braga) and Asturica Augusta (current Astorga), with a length of about 210 roman miles (about 330 kilometers).

== History ==
It was built between the years 79 and 80 during the rule of Vespasian and his son Titus by the legate C. Calpetanus Rantius Quirinalis Velerius Festus for commercial purposes, and restored in the times of Maximinus Thrax and his son Gaius Julius Verus Maximus. Its layout is reflected in detail in the Antonine Itinerary (3rd century).

Along its route, the roman miles are marked by milestones. Between Bracara Augusta and Asturica Augusta there are eleven mansio (post station and lodging). This route conserves the largest number of milestones in all of Europe.

== Itinerary ==
Mansio	Roman miles between each Mansio	Location
Bracara Augusta		Braga (Portugal)
Salaniana	XXI	Saim, Chorense, Terras de Bouro, (Portugal)
Aquis Oreginis, Aquis Ogeresibus, Aquis Ocerensis	XVIII	Baños de Riocaldo (Lobios, Ourense)
Aquis Querquennis	XIV	Baños de Bande (Bande, Ourense)
Geminas	XVI	Sandiás, Ourense
Salientibus	XVII	Xinzo da Costa (Maceda, Ourense)
Praesidio	XVIII	North of O Burgo (Ourense)
Nemetobriga	XIII	Between A Pobra de Trives and Laroco (Ourense)
Foro	XIX	La Rua de Valdeorras (Ourense)
Gemestario	XVIII	Portela de Aguiar (El Bierzo, León)
Castro Bergidum	XIII	Cacabelos (El Bierzo, León)
Interamnium Flavium	XX	Bembibre (El Bierzo, León)
Asturica Augusta	XXX	Astorga (León)

== See also ==
- Via XXXI
