= Fermín Bouza Brey =

Spanish anthropologist and writer (1901–1973)

Fermín Bouza-Brey
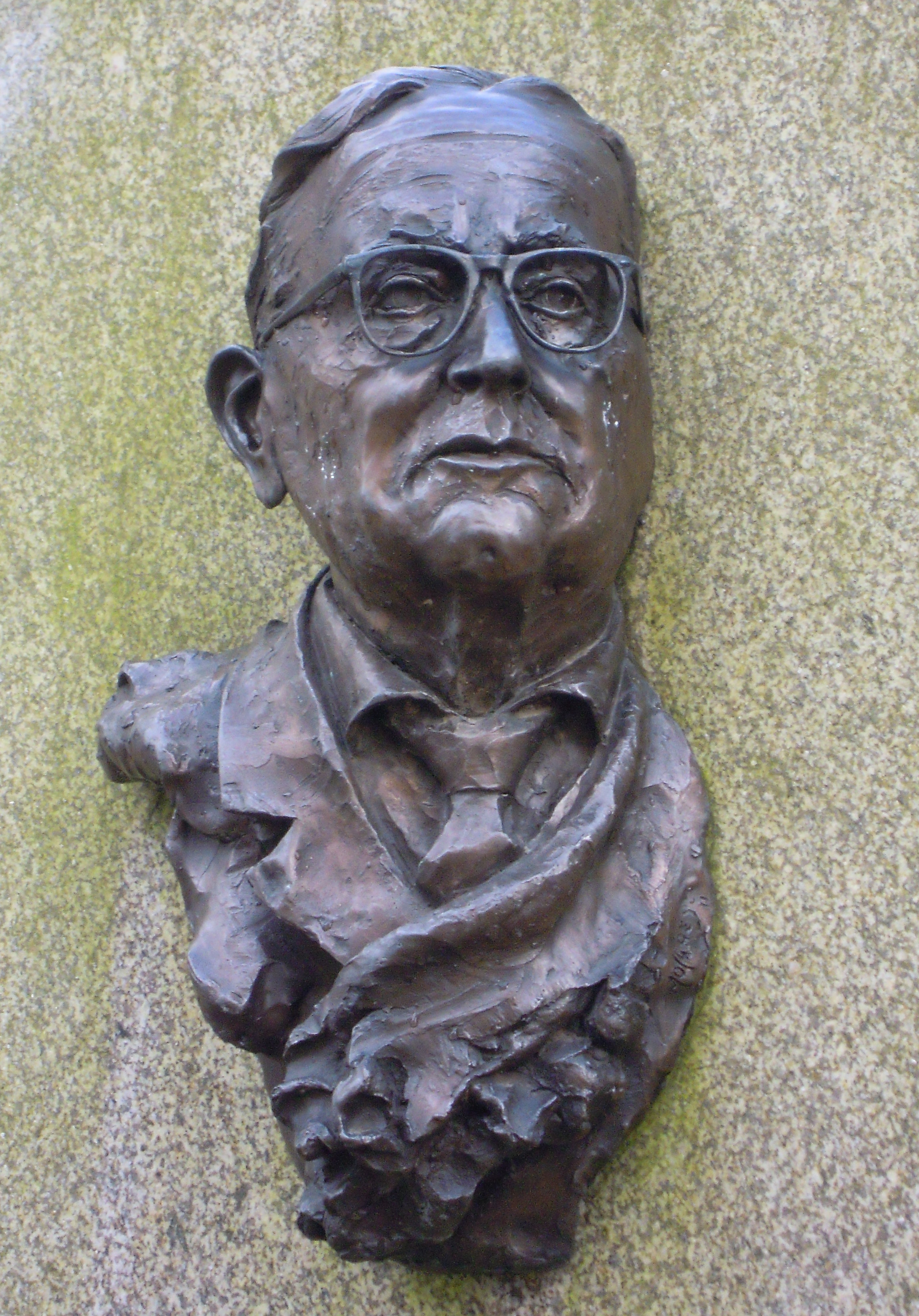
- Sculpture of Bouza Brey
- Born: 1901; Ponteareas, Spain
- Died: 1973 (aged 71–72); Santiago de Compostela, Spain
- Occupations: Writer, ethnographer, historian, judge
- Known for: Studies of the Galician language, archaeology and prehistory of Galicia; Neotrovadorism poetry
- Awards: Honoured on Galician Literature Day (1992)

Fermín Bouza-Brey (1901–1973) was a Spanish writer, ethnographer and historian who mainly wrote on the Galician language.

== Life ==
Born in Ponteareas, he published his first article in 1919, entitled Teatro de antaño en Santiago (Ancient Theatre in Santiago) and written in Spanish. In 1923 he became one of the founders of the Seminario de Estudos Galegos and the following year wrote his first article in Galician, specifically Os estudantes ao arcebispo (Students of the Archbishop). He also contributed to reviews and magazines such as Cristal, Resol and Nós.

He had become a judge in 1929, but during the Spanish Civil War he was kept out of that post because he was a Galician. He was re-appointed in 1938 as judge for Viella, then later for A Estrada. In 1941 he joined the Royal Galician Academy.

Despite Franco's dictatorship, he continued his research in the archaeology and prehistory department of the Instituto Padre Sarmiento. This mainly focussed on prehistory and archaeology in Galicia, though it did also extend to epigraphy, numismatics and ethnography. His main scholarly works were Bibliografia da prehistoria galega (Bibliography of Galician Prehistory), Prehistoria y Folclore de Barbanza (Prehistory and Folklore of Barbanza) and La civilización neo-eneolítica gallega (The Galician Neo-Chalcolithic Civilization).

He also studied the bibliography of Galician writers, especially his articles on Rosalía de Castro. He wrote poetry as the creator of Neotrovadorism, a trend later followed by Álvaro Cunqueiro and Álvarez Blázquez.

In 1992 the Galician Literature Day was dedicated to him which was celebrated in Cortegada, where he was buried after dying in Santiago de Compostela.

== Literary works ==
- Cabalgadas en Salnés, 1925 (prose)
- Nao senlleira, 1933 (poetry)
- Seitura, 1955 (poetry)

== Research works ==
- Bibliografia da prehistoria galega, 1927 (by Brey and López Cuevillas)
- Prehistoria y Folklore de Barbanza, 1928 (by Brey and López Cuevillas)
- La civilización neo-eneolítica gallega, 1931 (by Brey and López Cuevillas)
- Artigos rosalianos, in digital edition consultable at the RAG.
