= Aquis Querquennis =

Archaeological site in Spain

Coordinates: 41°58′26.8″N 7°58′50.6″W

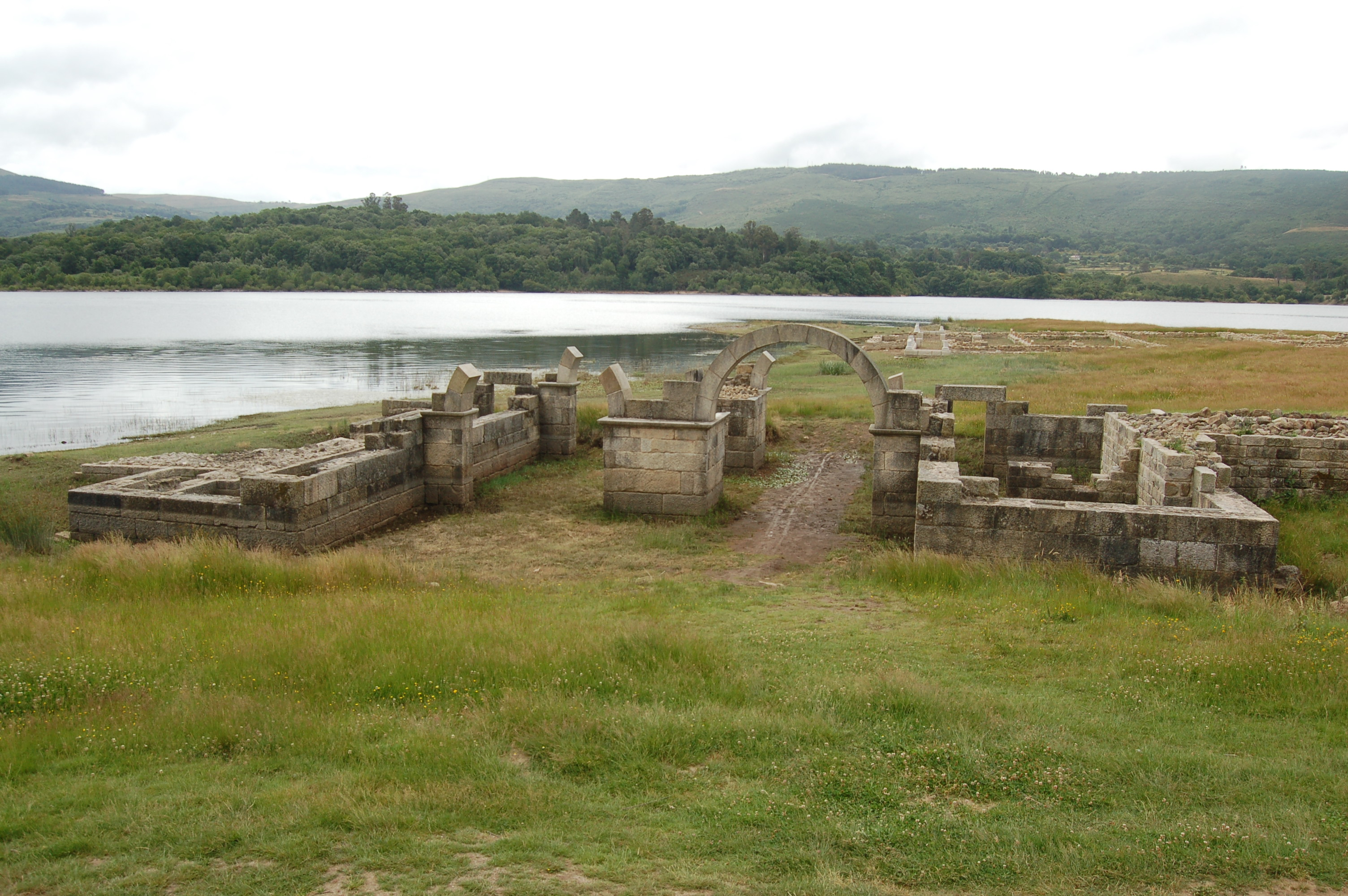
Entrance

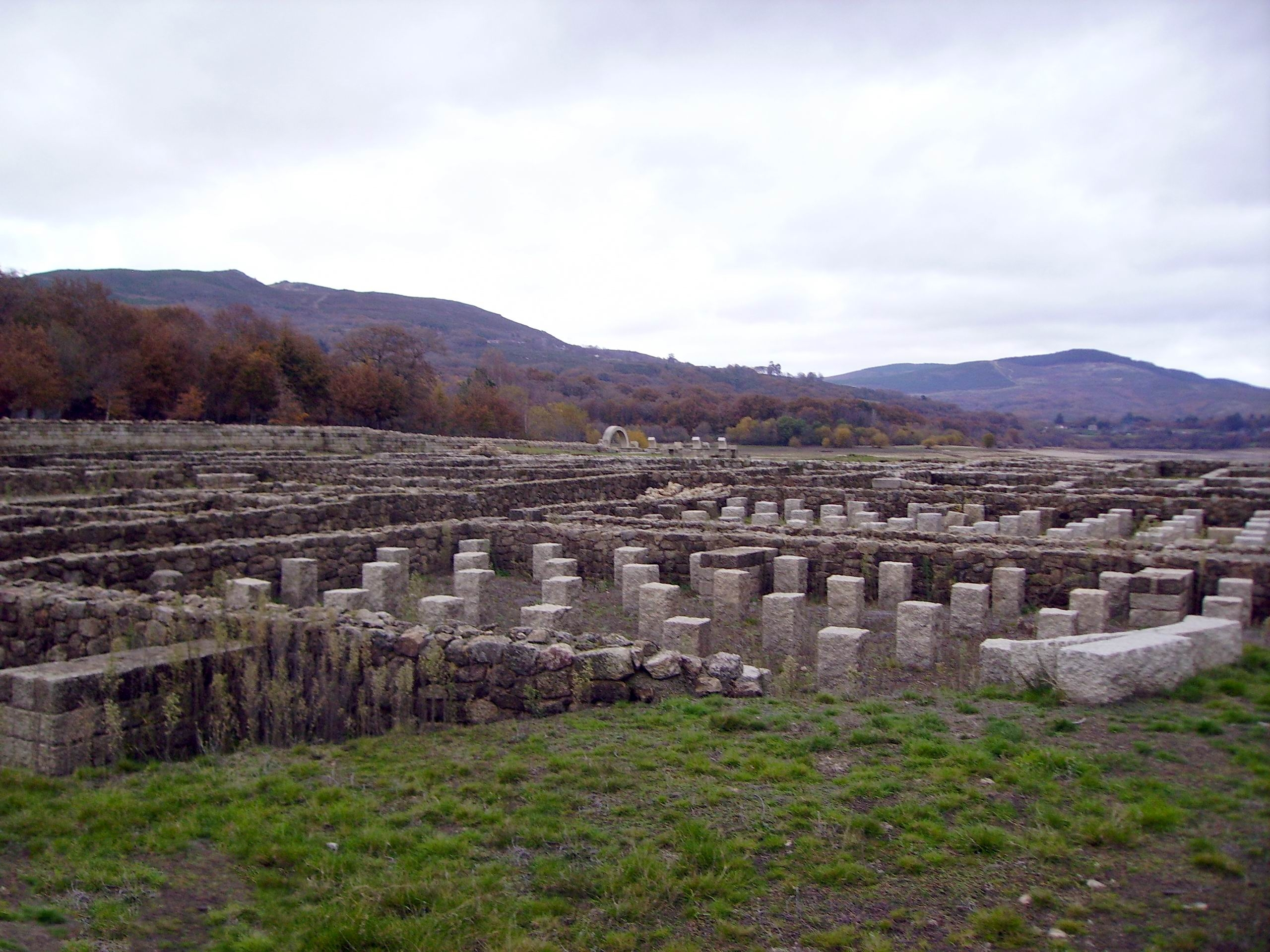
Building remains

Aquis Querquennis is a Roman fort in Ourense Province, Galicia. It was constructed circa 69-79 AD to house soldiers building the Via XVIII and was occupied by the Legio VII Gemina until that unit was posted to Dacia in 120 AD and the fort abandoned. The fort was rediscovered in the 1920s and some excavations carried out by local archaeologist Florentino López Cuevillas. In 1949 the site was flooded by construction of the As Conchas reservoir. Since 1975 excavations have been carried out on the fort during periods when the reservoir level falls.

== Description ==
The fort was constructed as a barracks for Roman legionaries working to construct the Via XVIII (also known as the Via Nova) between Bracara Augusta (modern-day Braga, Portugal) and Asturica Augusta (modern-day Astorga, Spain). The fort housed around 500 infantry and cavalry soldiers and was built circa 69-79 AD. The soldiers were drawn from the third cohort of the Legio VII Gemina, whose main base was at modern-day León, Spain. The unit was transferred to Dacia in 120 AD and the fort was then abandoned.

== Archaeology ==
The site of the fort lay forgotten until the 1920s when it was rediscovered and excavated by local archaeologist Florentino López Cuevillas. The site was flooded in 1949 as part of a Franco-era plan to construct the As Conchas reservoir. Parts of the site are exposed when the reservoir level falls. Excavations have been carried out on the exposed site since 1975 and the full extent, some 2.4 hectares (5.9 acres), was revealed by aerial photography in the 1980s. It is thought to be one of the largest Roman military camps in Iberia.

Excavations have uncovered a headquarters, two granaries, a hospital, five barracks and a mansio to house travelling officials, plus roads, drains, walls, towers, gates and a perimeter road. Because of its size the site has become known locally as A cidá ("the city"). The fort was designated a Bien de Interés Cultural in 2018 and houses the Aquae Querquennae-Vía Nova Interpretation Center, a museum of the road and fort. It lies near to the natural hot springs and Roman bathhouses at O Bano. The site in its entirety was uncovered in August 2022 when reservoir levels fell to 49% of capacity.
