= Lois Tobío Fernández =

Spanish diplomat, writer, and philologist (1906–2003)

- Born: {Birth date|1906|06|13}} Viveiro, Galicia, Spain
- Died: March 13, 2003 (aged 96); Madrid, Spain
- Education: University of Santiago de Compostela
- Occupations: Translator, writer, diplomat, philologist
- Known for: Founder of the Seminario de Estudos Galegos
- Spouse: María del Carmen Soler
- Children: 1 son & 1 daughter
- Parent(s): Lois Tobío Campos (father); María Tobío (mother)

Signature
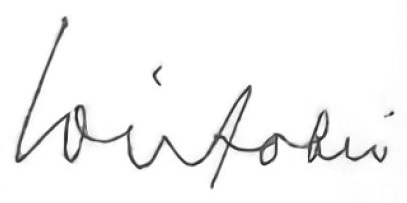

Lois Tobío Fernández (13 June 1906 – 13 March 2003) was a Spanish diplomat, writer, and translator. He played an active role in the cultural and political life of Galicia during the Second Spanish Republic and later in exile.

== Biography ==
Born in Viveiro to a family with ties to the Galician literary world, Tobío studied law at the University of Santiago de Compostela. There, he became involved in intellectual and cultural activities and co-founded the Seminario de Estudos Galegos (Seminar of Galician Studies), where he coordinated the Social, Legal, and Economic Sciences section.

Following the proclamation of the Second Spanish Republic in 1931, he helped draft the Statute of Autonomy of Galicia (1936) along with notable Galician nationalists such as Ricardo Carvalho Calero and Alexandre Bóveda.

In 1933, he joined the Spanish diplomatic service and held posts in Bulgaria, Uruguay, and Mexico. During the Spanish Civil War, he remained loyal to the Republic and served in various roles within the Ministry of State.

After the Republican defeat in 1939, Tobío went into exile. He lived in Cuba, Mexico, and eventually settled in Montevideo, Uruguay, where he worked as a journalist and later as an executive in a pharmaceutical company. He continued his cultural and political engagement through the Galician diaspora.

In the 1960s, he returned to Spain, where he continued translating and writing until his retirement.

== Works ==
=== Translations ===
Tobío translated numerous works from German, English, and French into Spanish and Galician, including:

- The Life of Greece by Will Durant
- Narziss und Goldmund by Hermann Hesse
- Staatslehre by Hermann Heller
- Peter Camenzind and Henri Quatre by Heinrich Mann
- Os sonetos a Orfeu by Rainer Maria Rilke (1980, Galician)
- Nai Coraxe e mais os seus fillos by Bertolt Brecht (1987, Galician)
- Fausto by Goethe (1996, Galician)

=== Original works ===
- As décadas de T.L. (1994) – autobiography
- A nova vida (2006, posthumous)
- Catro ensaios sobre o Conde de Gondomar (1991)
- Gondomar y los católicos ingleses (1987)
- Gondomar y su triunfo sobre Raleigh (1974)
- A intervención de Gondomar nos problemas internacionais da pesca (1984)

== Awards ==
- Trasalba Prize (1991)
- Arts and Letters of Galicia Award (1999)
- Medal of Honour of Viveiro (1997)
- Honorary citizen of Gondomar (posthumous, 2005)

== Legacy ==
Tobío is remembered for his commitment to Galician culture and his role in the promotion of Galician autonomy and literature, both in Spain and abroad.
