= Seminario de Estudos Galegos =

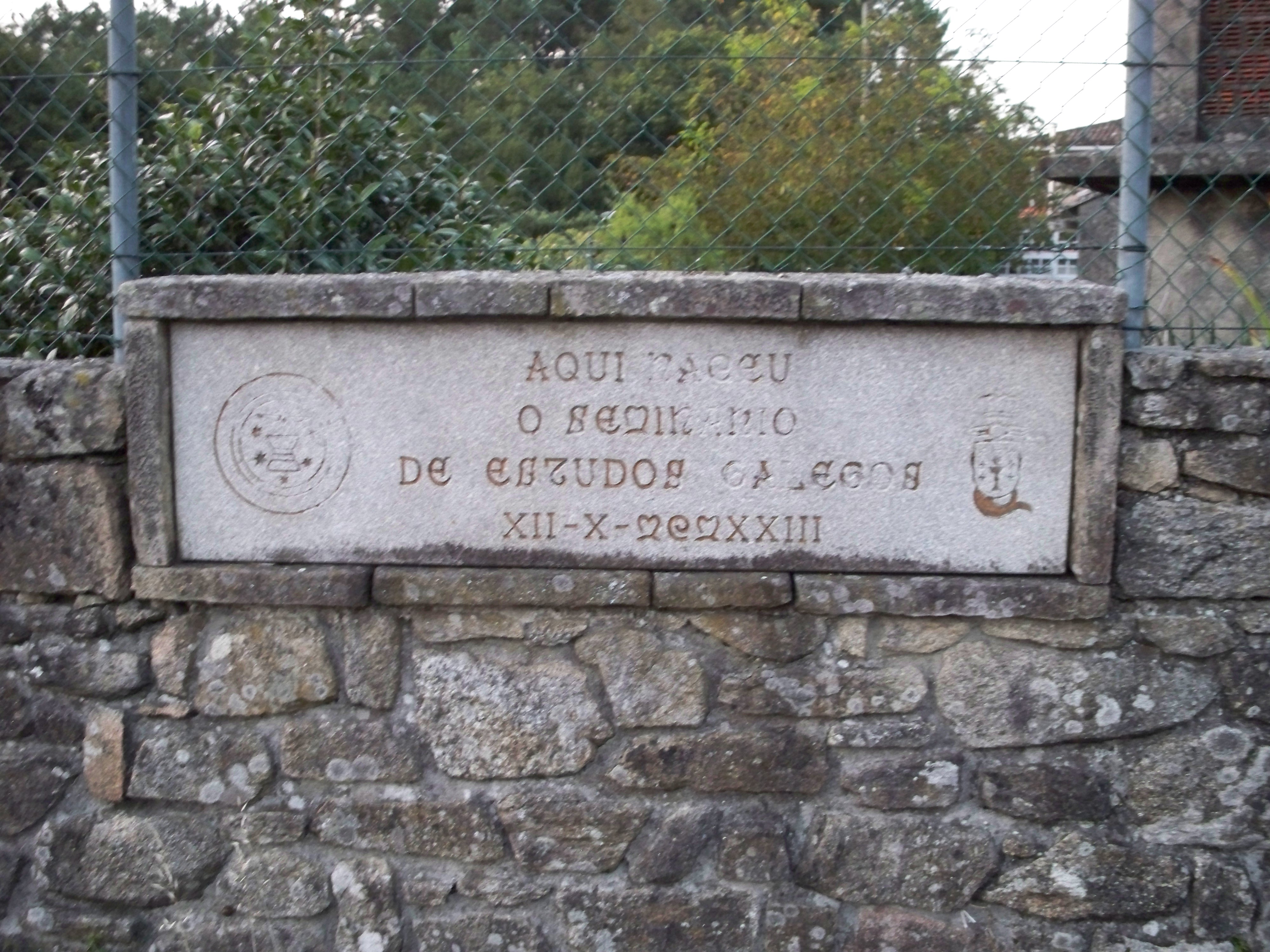
AQUÍ NACEU O SEMINARIO DE ESTUDOS GALEGOS XII-X-MCMXXIII

The Seminar of Galician Studies (Galician: Seminario de Estudos Galegos, SEG) was an institution established in 1923 with the purpose of studying and promoting the Galician cultural heritage.
