= Museum of Greek Folk Musical Instruments =

Coordinates: 37°58′27.8″N 23°43′38.8″E

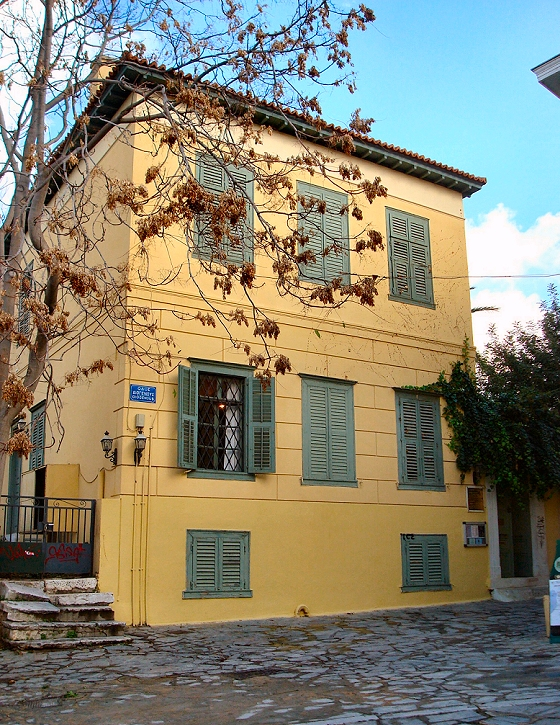
- Location: 1-3, Diogenous Str., Plaka, Athens, Greece
- Type: Musical instrument museum
- Director: Vaso Polyzoi
- Public transit access: Athens Metro stations: Monastiraki station
- Website: melmo.culture.gov.gr/to-mouseio/

The Museum of Greek Folk Musical Instruments (Greek: Μουσείο Ελληνικών Λαϊκών Μουσικών Οργάνων) is a museum and Research Centre for Ethnomusicology in the Lassanis Mansion, Plaka, Athens, Greece. It displays about 600 Greek musical instruments from the last 300 years and has as many more in store.

== Collection ==
The collection includes:

- Lyres
- Flogheras
- Defia
- Gaides
- Koudounia
- Laghouta
- Bouzoukia
- Souravlia
- Zournades
- Lalitsas
- Toubelekia
- Cretan lyras

== Gallery ==
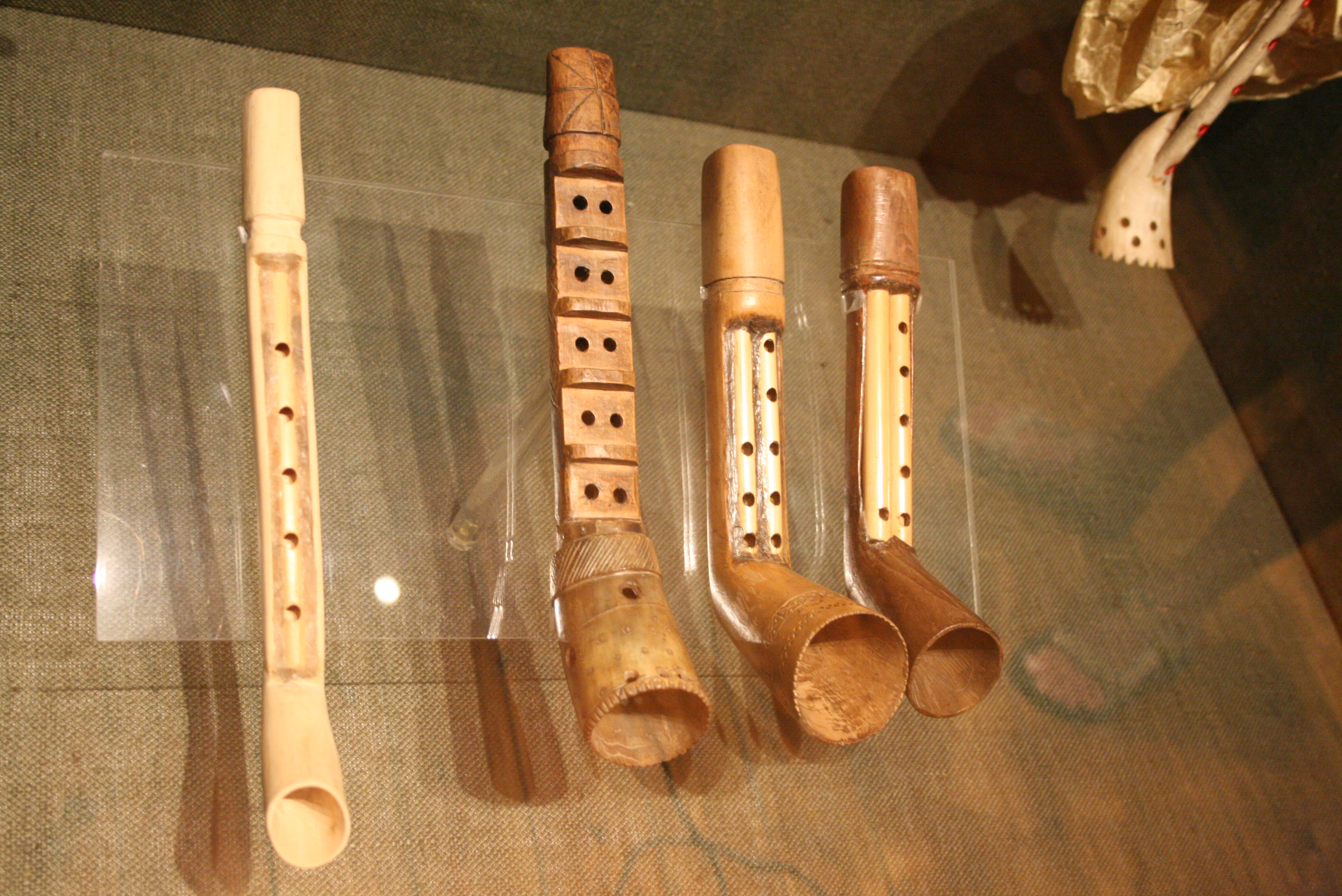
Askomandoura

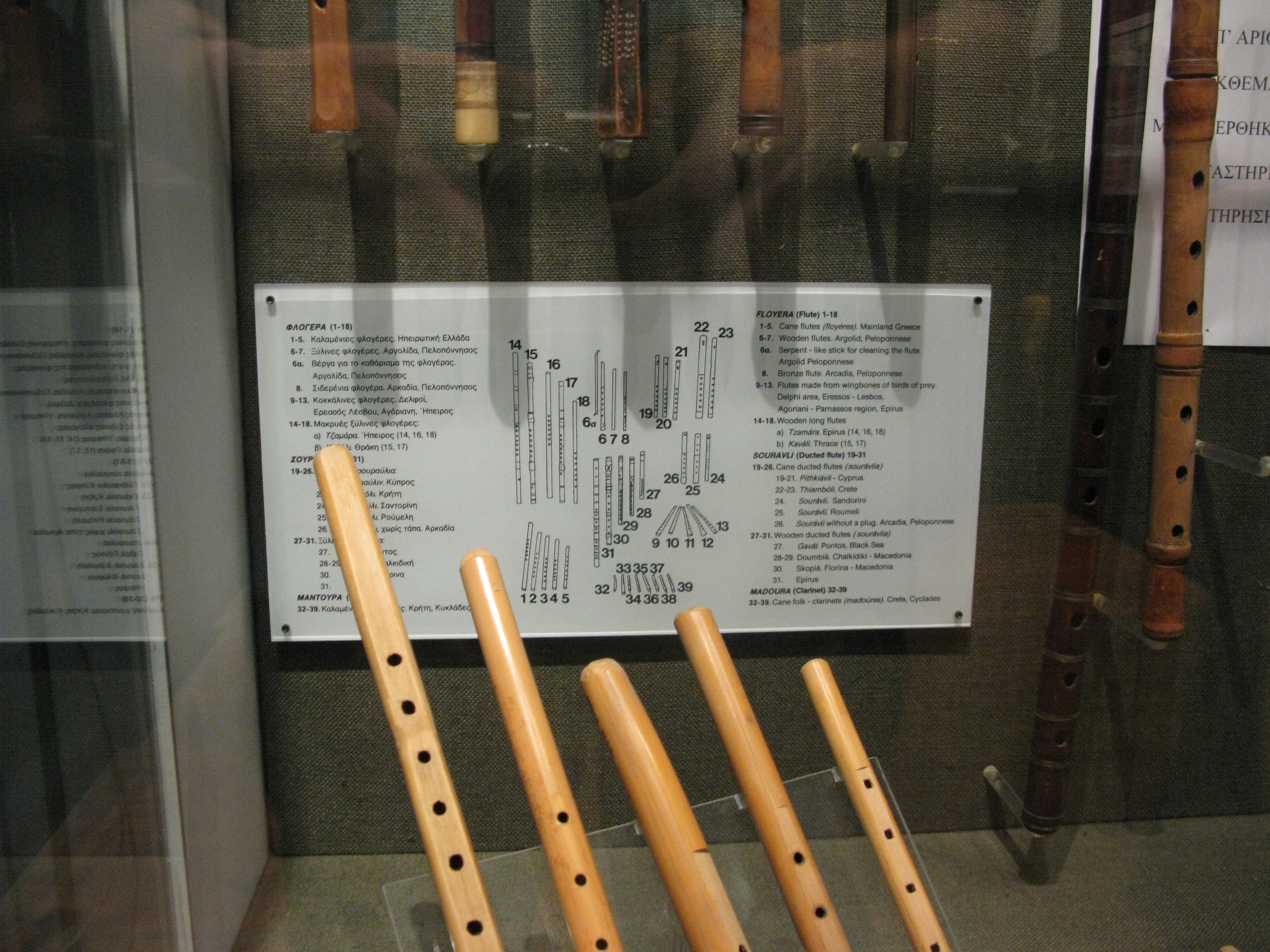
Floghera (flute)

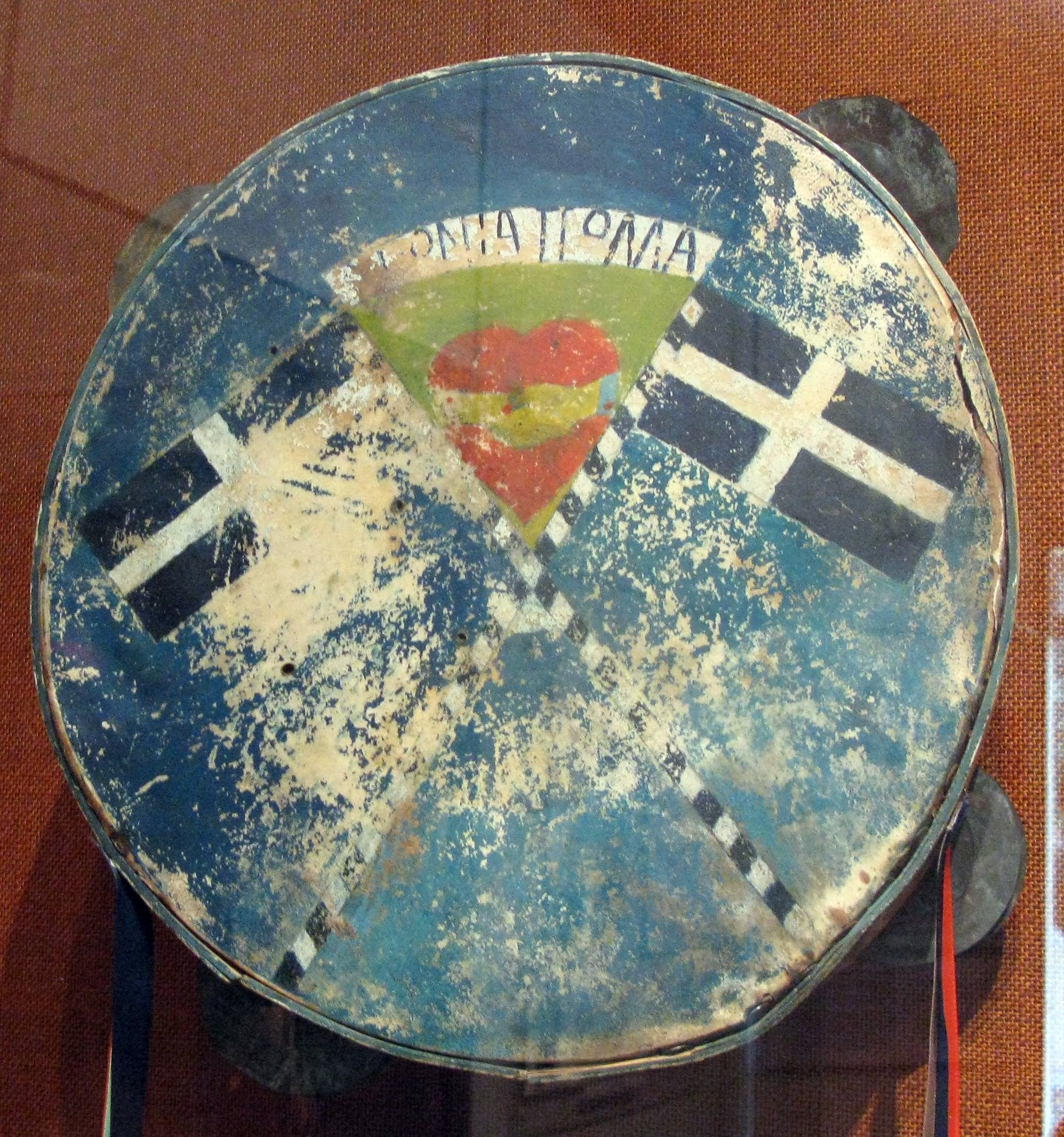
Tambourine

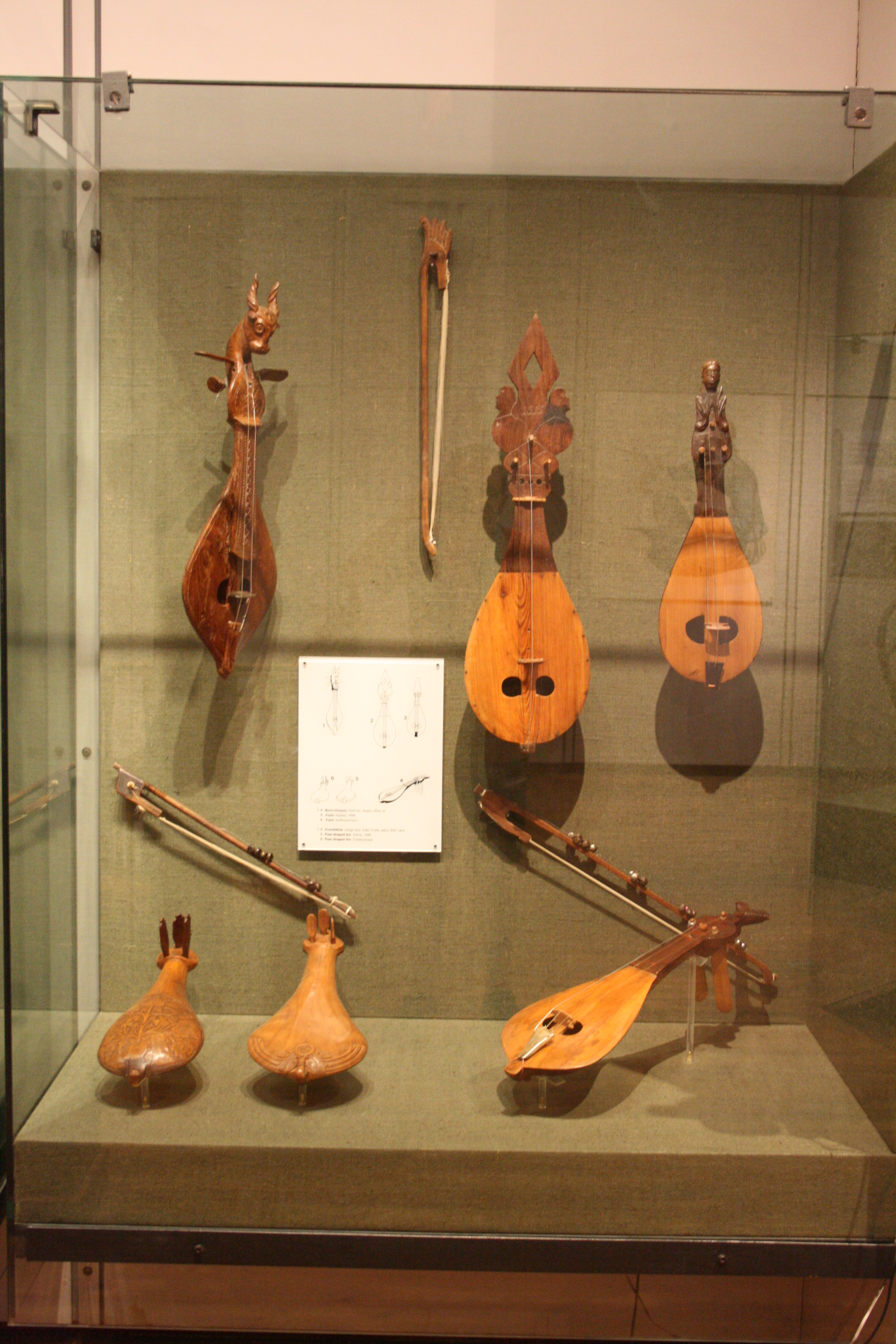
Cretan Lyras

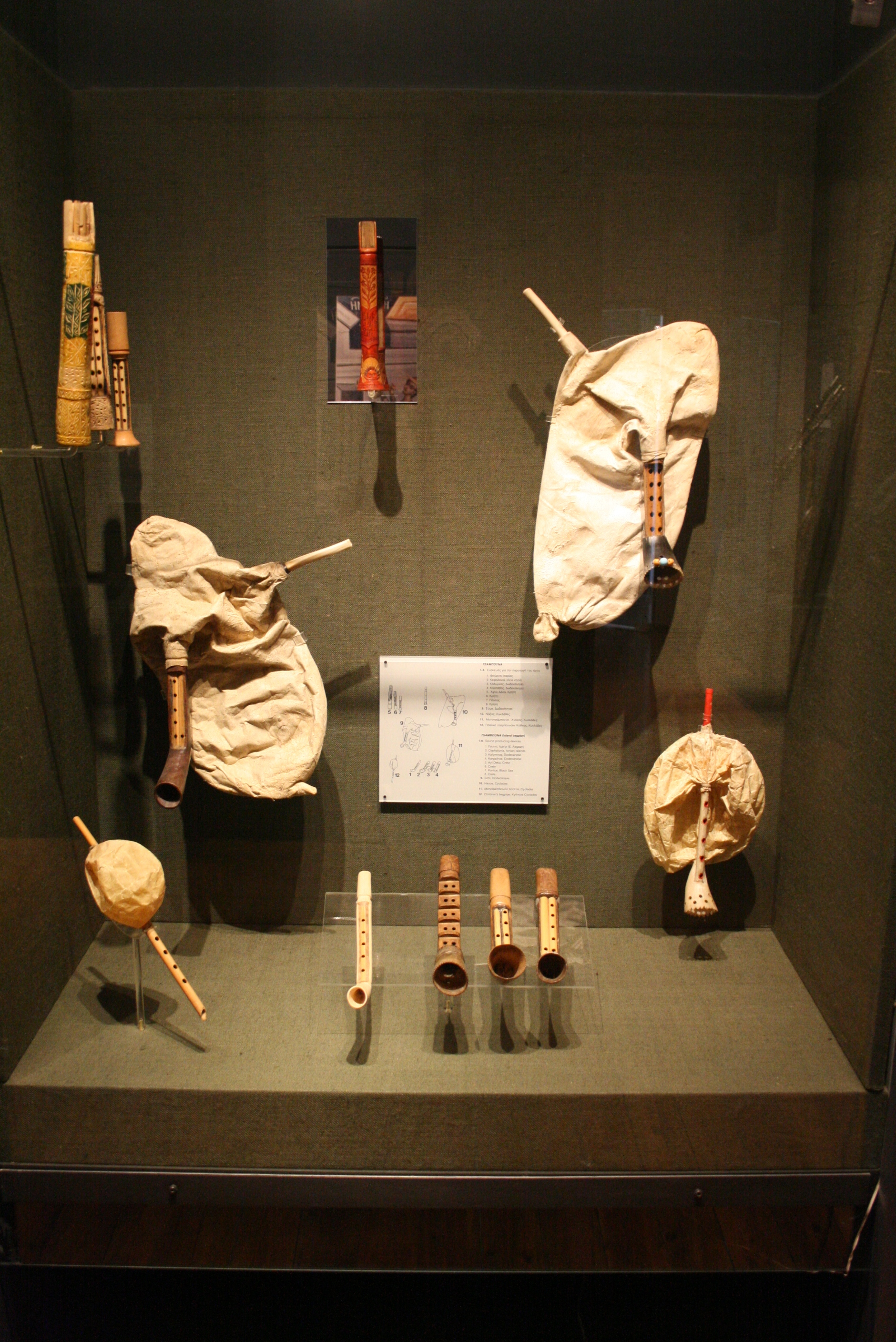
Tsampouna

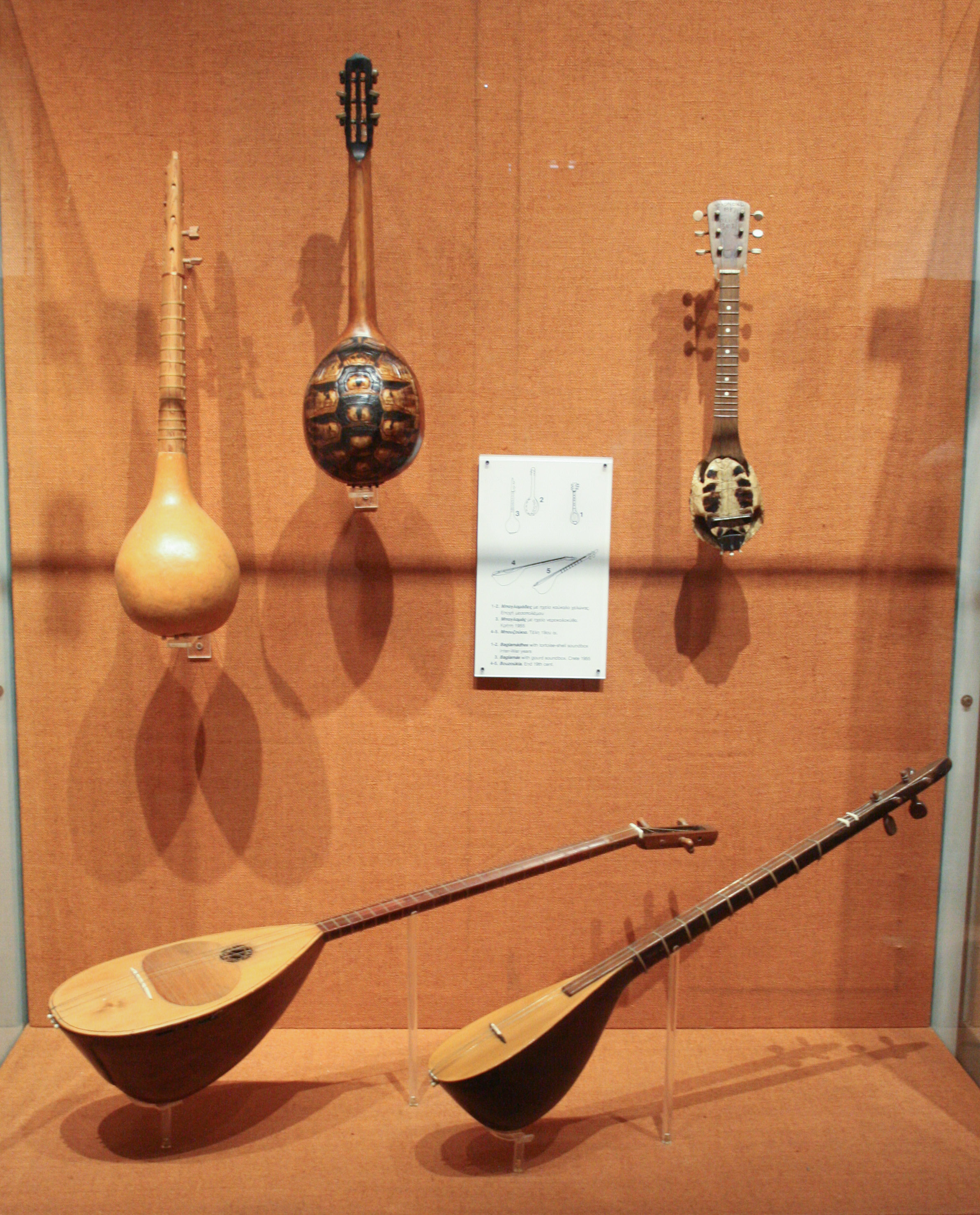
Bouzouki

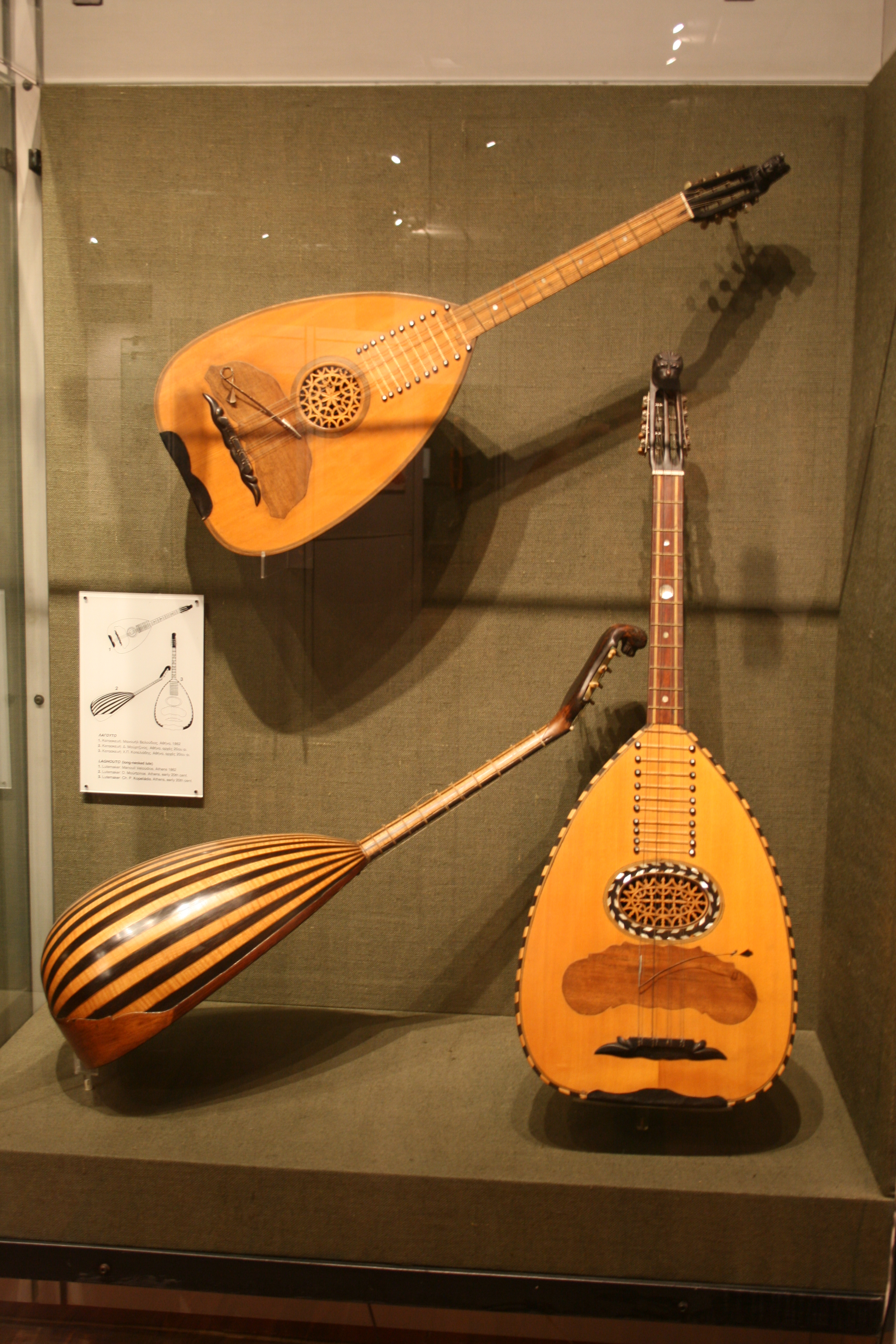
Laouto

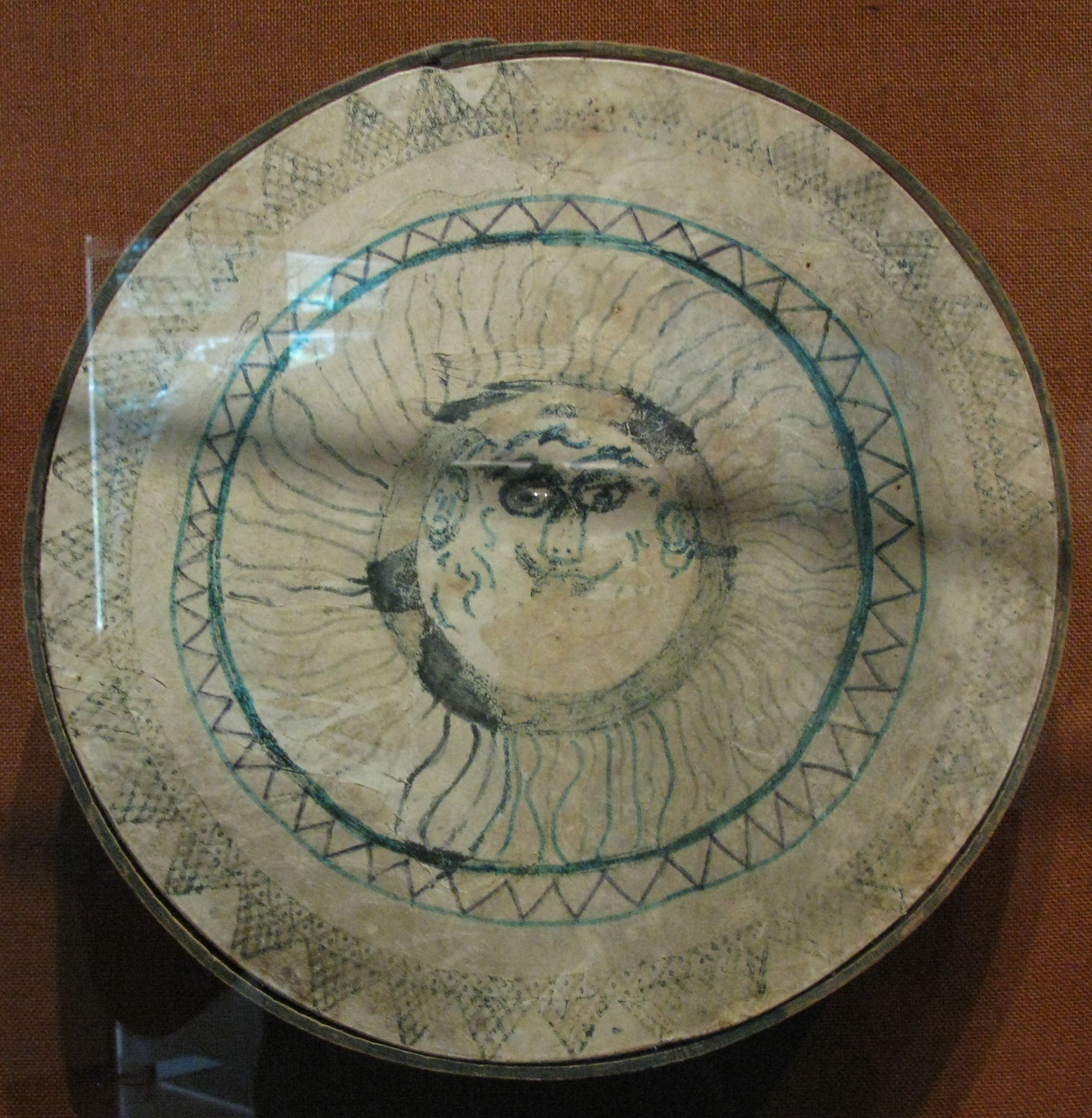
Tamboutsa (Cyprus)

== See also ==
- List of music museums
