= Tulum (bagpipe) =

Musical instrument (wind)

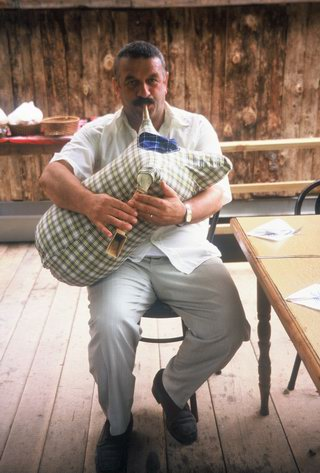
- Classification: Bagpiping

Related instruments
- List: Bock (Czech); Gajda (Macedonian); Cimpoi (Romanian); Duda (Hungarian/Polish); Koza (Polish); Diple (Dalmatia); Mih (Istrian); Tulum (Azerbaijan, Turkish and Pontic); Tsambouna (Dodecanese and Cyclades); Askomandoura (Crete); Gajdy (Polish/Czech/Slovak); Gaita (Galician)(Asturian); Gaida (Bulgarian); Surle (Serbian/Croatian); Mezoued/Zukra (Northern Africa); Guda, tulum (Laz people); Angeion, zimpona (Pontic); Parkapzuk (Armenia); Gudastviri (Georgia); Tsimboni (Georgia)(Adjara); Shuvyr (Circassians ); Sahbr, Shapar (Chuvashia); Volynka (Ukrainian: Волинка), (Russian: Волынка) (Ukraine, Russia); Swedish bagpipes (Sweden); Ney-anbān (Iran)

Traditional bagpipe (Gayda/Tulum) making and performing
- UNESCO Intangible Cultural Heritage
- Country: Turkey and North Macedonia
- Reference: 02114
- Region: Europe and North America

Inscription history
- Inscription: 2024 (19th session)
- List: Representative

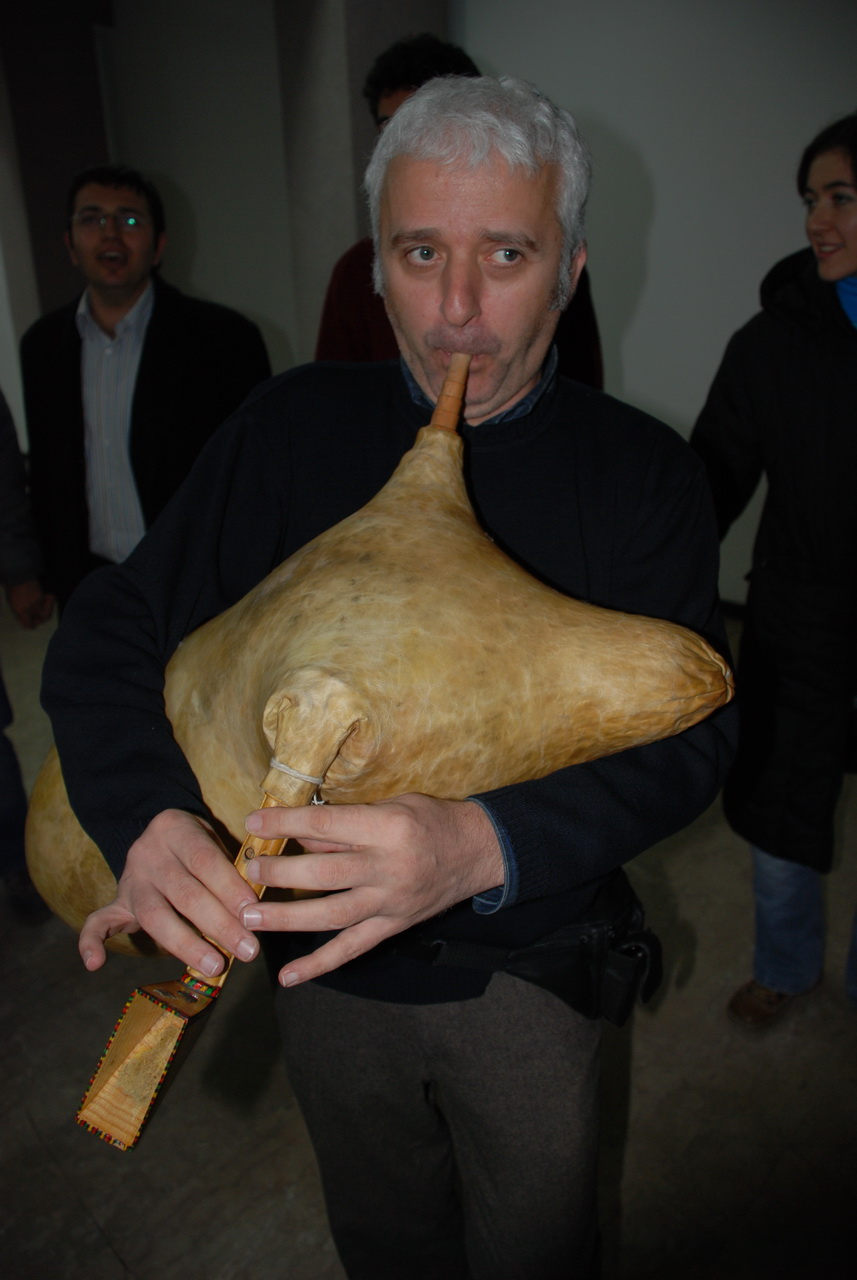
Laz musician Birol Topaloglu plays the tulum

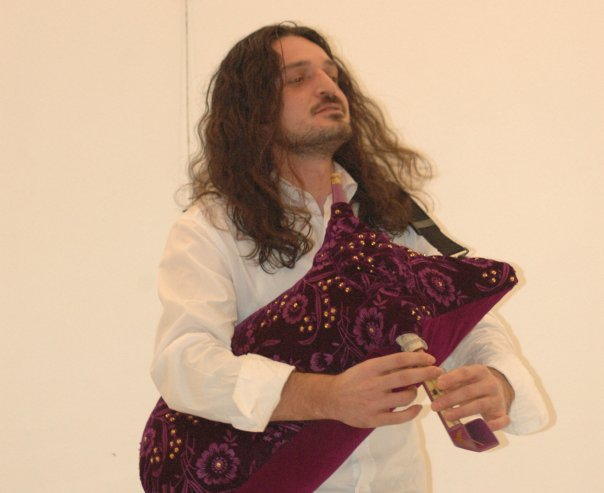
Hemshin musician Behçet Gülas plays the tulum

The tulum (Laz: გუდა, romanized: guda) is a musical instrument, a form of bagpipe from the Black Sea region of Turkey. It is droneless with two parallel chanters, and is usually played by the Laz, Black sea Turks, Hemshin peoples and by Pontic Greeks, particularly Chaldians. It is a prominent instrument in the music of Pazar, Hemşin, Çamlıhemşin, Ardeşen, Fındıklı, Arhavi, Hopa, some other districts of Artvin and in the villages of the Tatos range (the watershed between the provinces of Rize and Trabzon) of İspir. It is the characteristic instrument of the transhumant population of the northeastern provinces of Anatolia and, like the kemençe in its area, the tulum imposes its style on all the dance and entertainment music of those for whom it is "our music".

== Terminology ==
Some of the names of bagpipes from the Near East include:

- Guda (Laz)
- Gudastvri, გუდასტვირი (Georgian)
- Ç'ip'oni (Artvin, Adjara, Lazona)
- Dankiyo (Pontic Greek, Romeika)
- Parkapzuk, Պարկապզուկ (Armenian)
- Shuvyr (Mari people), North Circassians)
- Shabr, Shapar (Chuvash)
- Tulum (Azerbaijani, Turkish).

== Etymology ==
The name tulum comes from the Turkish word tulum, meaning "a skin container", which itself originates from the Proto-Turkic word tōl- ("to be full").

== Regional distribution ==
=== Rize ===
The tulum is commonly played in the districts of Pazar, Ardeşen, Çamlıhemşin, Hemşin, Fındıklı, and Güneysu in Rize province. In the past, it was prevalent in the western districts of Rize, but today the tulum culture is not widespread in western Rize.

=== Artvin ===
The tulum is a common instrument throughout the Artvin province; however, it is more widespread in the inland districts, particularly: Artvin, Borçka, Şavşat, Murgul, Ardanuç, and Yusufeli.

=== Gümüşhane ===
The tulum was once a widespread musical instrument in much of Gümüşhane province. It was commonly used in Gümüşhane city center, Torul, Şiran, the northern villages of Kelkit district, and partly in Köse district. However, over time it was replaced by the Kemençe and Zurna. Today, the tulum is mostly played in the villages of Gümüşhane city center.

=== Erzurum ===
The tulum is widely played in the northern districts of Erzurum province, located in the Black Sea region. It is particularly common in the districts of İspir, Tortum, Oltu, Pazaryolu, Uzundere and Olur. Both Horon and Bar dances are commonly performed with the tulum.

=== Ardahan ===
It is particularly common in the Posof district of Ardahan province and in many villages in Ardahan.

=== Bayburt ===
It used to be widely played in the northern villages of Bayburt province and in the Aydıntepe district, but nowadays it has been largely replaced by the Zurna and Kaval.

== See also ==
- Dankiyo
- Tulum-zurna
- Hemshin peoples
- List of bagpipes
