= Shyuvr =

Mari bagpipe

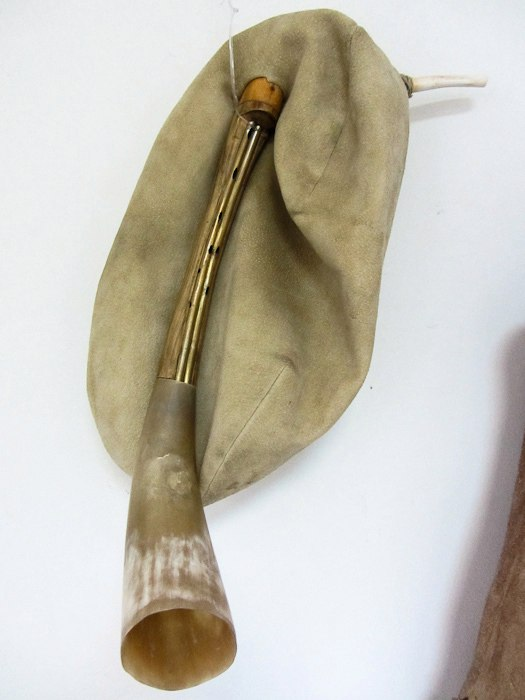
- Classification: Bagpiping

Related instruments
- Bock (Czech); Cimpoi (Romanian); Duda (Hungarian/Polish); Koza (Polish); Diple (Dalmatian Coast); Mih (Istrian); Tulum (Turkish and Pontic); Tsambouna (Dodecanese and Cyclades); Askomandoura (Crete); Gajdy (Polish/Czech/Slovak); Gaita (Galician)([Asturian]); Surle (Serbian/Croatian); Mezoued/Zukra (Northern Africa); Guda, tulum (Laz people); Dankiyo, zimpona (Pontic); Parkapzuk (Armenia); Gudastviri (Georgia (country)); Tsimboni (Georgia (country) )(Adjara); Sahbr, Shapar (Chuvashia); Tulug (Azerbaijan); Volynka (Ukrainian: Волинка), (Russian: Волынка) (Ukraine, Russia); Swedish bagpipes (Sweden); Ney anban(Iran)

The shyuvr or shuvyr (chiabour in French sources, Russian: Шувыр) is a type of bagpipe of the Mari people, a Volga-Finnic people living in the Mari El Republic of central-western Russia. It is described as small bagpipe, consisting of a bag, a bone blowpipe, and two tubes of tin joined by a wooden sheath. The pipe is almost always played with the tumyr, a Mari drum.

An 1892 French work noted that the Mari had developed three instruments: a cithare (zither or cittern), bagpipe, and drum. A later English work makes a similar statement, saying that the Mari have two instruments unique to their culture: the kusle mult-stringed zither, and the shyuvr bagpipe.
