= Greek bagpipes =

The Greek bagpipe(s) may refer to:

- Tsampouna, a double-chantered, droneless bagpipe played mostly in the Greek Islands
- Askomandoura, a Cretan bagpipe similar to the tsampouna
- Dankiyo, a bagpipe played in the historically ethnic Greek regions of Trabzon and Rize in what is now Turkey
- Gaida, a type of bagpipe played in northern Greece and the Balkans
