= Gudastviri =

Musical instrument

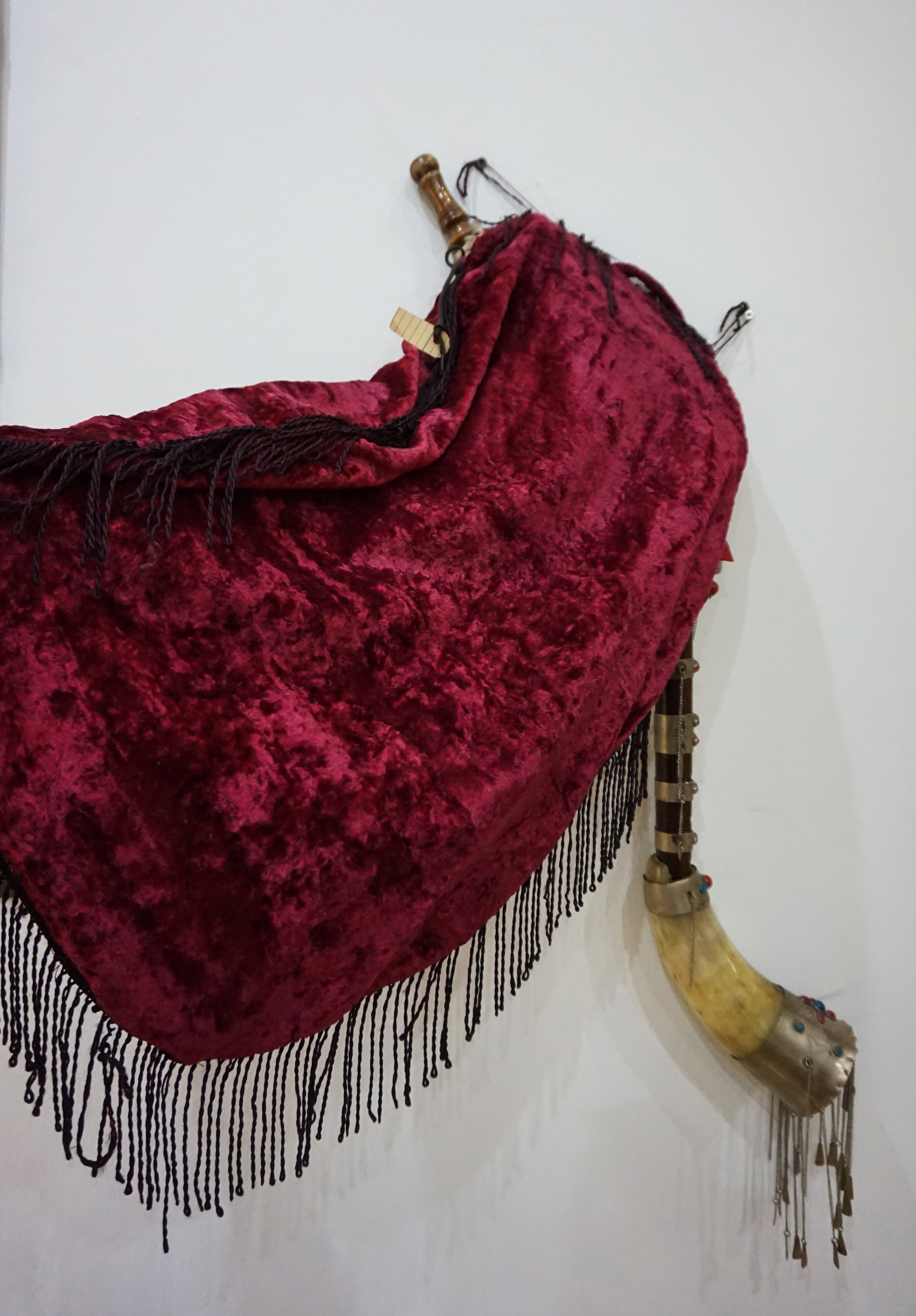

Woodwind instrument
- Other names: გუდასტვირი
- Classification: Bagpipe

Related instruments
- Bock (Czech); Cimpoi (Romanian); Duda (Hungarian/Polish); Koza (Polish); Diple (Dalmatian Coast); Mih (Istrian); Tulum (Turkish and Pontic); Tsambouna (Dodecanese and Cyclades); Askomandoura (Crete); Gajdy (Polish/Czech/Slovak); Gaita (Galician)([Asturian]); Surle (Serbian/Croatian); Mezoued/Zukra (Northern Africa); Guda, tulum (Laz people); Dankiyo, zimpona (Pontic); Parkapzuk (Armenia); Gudastviri (Georgia (country)); Tsimboni (Georgia (country) )(Adjara); Shyuvr (Mari); Sahbr, Shapar (Chuvashia); Tulug (Azerbaijan); Volynka (Ukrainian: Волинка), (Russian: Волынка) (Ukraine, Russia); Swedish bagpipes (Sweden); Ney anban (Iran)

The gudastviri (Georgian: გუდასტვირი) is a droneless, double-chantered, horn-belled bagpipe played in Georgia. The term comes from the words guda (bag) and stviri (whistling). In some regions, the instrument is called the chiboni, stviri, or tulumi.

== Dispersion ==
This type of bagpipe is found in many regions of Georgia, and is known by different names in various areas.

- Kartli, Pshavi and Racha (stviri)
- Eastern Kakheti, Adjara (chiboni)
- Meskheti (tulumi)
- Imereti (gudastviri)

These variants differ from one another in timbre, capacity/size of the bag, and number of holes on the two pipes.

== Construction ==
The gudastviri is made up of two main parts: The first being a whole sheep or goat skin, or a sewed, rectangular leather bag (“guda”). The second is a yoked double-chante ("stviri"), terminating in a single horn bell, which makes the gudastviri a member of the hornpipe class of bagpipes.

There is a small wooden blow-pipe (khreko) with a check-valve tied into one leg, or corner of the bag. A fixed round wooden stock holding the chanter, is tied into the bag, in the opposite foreleg, or corner. The chanter itself has two wooden pipes (dedani) of equal length, bore and wall thickness, which are inserted into the stock. The left chanter tube "leader" has the most finger holes, it is also called “teller” or “beginner”. The right chanter tube "bass" is called mebane or "deep voice producer". This bass pipe has three front-facing holes and the “beginner”, has six holes (but the Adjaran chiboni's leader pipe has only five holes). The three bottom holes of the left pipe are placed symmetrically across from the three holes of the right pipe.

== Tuning ==
The Adjaran chiboni has a diatonic scale. It can produce two-part chords and two-part tunes. The two parts are produced by the simultaneous sound of both dedanis. The player's left hand plays the highest notes of the scale on the left chanter tube, while the fingers of the player's right hand covers and uncovers the lower notes of the scale, which is made possible by the limited number of finger holes (only 3 or 4 holes) disposed lower down, toward the distal end of the right chanter tube.

The compass of a chiboni is major sixth (but the Rachian gudastviri's diapason can be a minor, or a major seventh). The ends of the pipes are fixed inside the resonator/horn. The horn is made of Caucasian goat or bull horn. The gudastviri is decorated with silver bands, mounted with colored glass beads, and numerous small chains. There is a ball of cotton wool inserted into the open end of the horn, to absorb the moisture formed during playing. The bag (guda) can have a bag cover of cloth or leather, or have the natural goat hair left on the outside of the bag.

The six holes of the left reed pipe emit notes of the first octave: F, E, D, C, B, A, G; the three holes of the right one emit deep-voiced notes: C, B, A, G.

== Playing and application ==
The gudastviri is used for vocal accompaniment. A majority of recitative songs were performed with its accompaniment, in the region of Racha. The gudastviri player's repertoire consists of historical, epic, satirical, comic, and lyrical verses, which are performed as one part songs. These songs are recitatives and it is the text, not the melody, that is the most important part of the performance.

Traditionally, only men play this instrument, and Rachian gudastviri players were strolling musicians, who were welcomed as guests, at every family merriment, party, or wedding. It was a kind of profession that served as the main source of the player's income. Gudastviri players often took part in the old Georgian improvisation competition known as berikaoba, where they had to invent a witty epic, lyrical or comical poems, "on the spot" and retell these poems, accompanied with Gudastviri music. The competition was often won by the most skillful berika (participant).

== Design and development ==
In the region of eastern Javakheti, gudastviri pipes are made of very young branches of a dog-rose. The gudastviri itself is normally constructed by the player to his tastes. Jewellers may also be hired to ornament the instrument.

Among the kinds of Georgian gudastviri, the most developed is Adjarian chiboni. As for the gudastviri of Pshavi, it belongs perhaps, to an earlier stage of development, as it has only one hole on the bass chanter, possibly indicating this instrument's early origin.

== Resources ==
- The Gajdy Weblog of Ernesto Fisher
- (in Georgian) ხალხური ჰანგები, Khalkhuri Hangebi, "National Tunes": a history of Georgian folk instruments
