= Volynka =

Musical instrument

- Classification: Bagpiping
- Hornbostel–Sachs classification: 421.111-12

Related instruments
- Bock (Czech); Cimpoi (Romanian); Duda (Hungarian/Polish/Belarusian); Koza (Polish); Diple (Dalmatian Coast); Tulum (Turkish and Pontic); Tsambouna (Dodecanese and Cyclades); Askomandoura (Crete); Gajdy (Polish/Czech/Slovak); Gaita (Galician); Surle (Serbian/Croatian); Mezoued/Zukra (Northern Africa); Guda, tulum (Laz people); Dankiyo, zimpona (Pontic); Parkapzuk (Armenia); Gudastviri (Georgia); Tsimboni (Georgia) (Adjara); Shuvyr (Mari El Republic ); Sahbr, Shapar (Chuvashia); Tulug (Azerbaijan); Gaida (South Eastern Europe) (the Balkans)

The volynka (Ukrainian: волинка, коза; Russian: волынка; Crimean Tatar: tulup zurna – see also duda, and koza) is a bagpipe. Its etymology comes from the region Volyn, Ukraine, where it was borrowed from Romania.

The volynka is constructed around a goat skin air reservoir into which air is blown through a pipe with a valve to stop air escaping. (Modern concert instruments often have a reservoir made from a basketball bladder). A number of playing pipes [two to four] extend from the reservoir holding the air. The main playing pipe on which the melody is played has five to seven, sometimes eight finger holes. The other pipes produce a drone. This is usually either a single tonic note or a perfect fifth. Each of these playing pipes has a double reed usually made from a goose quill. In the 20th century this instrument has lost the popularity it had previously, and is rarely used today in an authentic context.

== Modern usage ==
The instrument has gained popularity in stage performance. It has been used in a number of songs by Russian rock bands DDT, Aquarium, and Aria. It also appears more in Ukrainian folk music and Russian folk music ensembles.

== See also ==
- List of bagpipes
- Pilai, a Finnish bagpipe described as similar to the volynka

== Sources ==
- Humeniuk, A. - Ukrainski narodni muzychni instrumenty - Kyiv: Naukova dumka, 1967
- Mizynec, V. - Ukrainian Folk Instruments - Melbourne: Bayda books, 1984
- Cherkaskyi, L. - Ukrainski narodni muzychni instrumenty // Tekhnika, Kyiv, Ukraine, 2003 - 262 pages. ISBN 966-575-111-5
