= Modern Greek folklore =

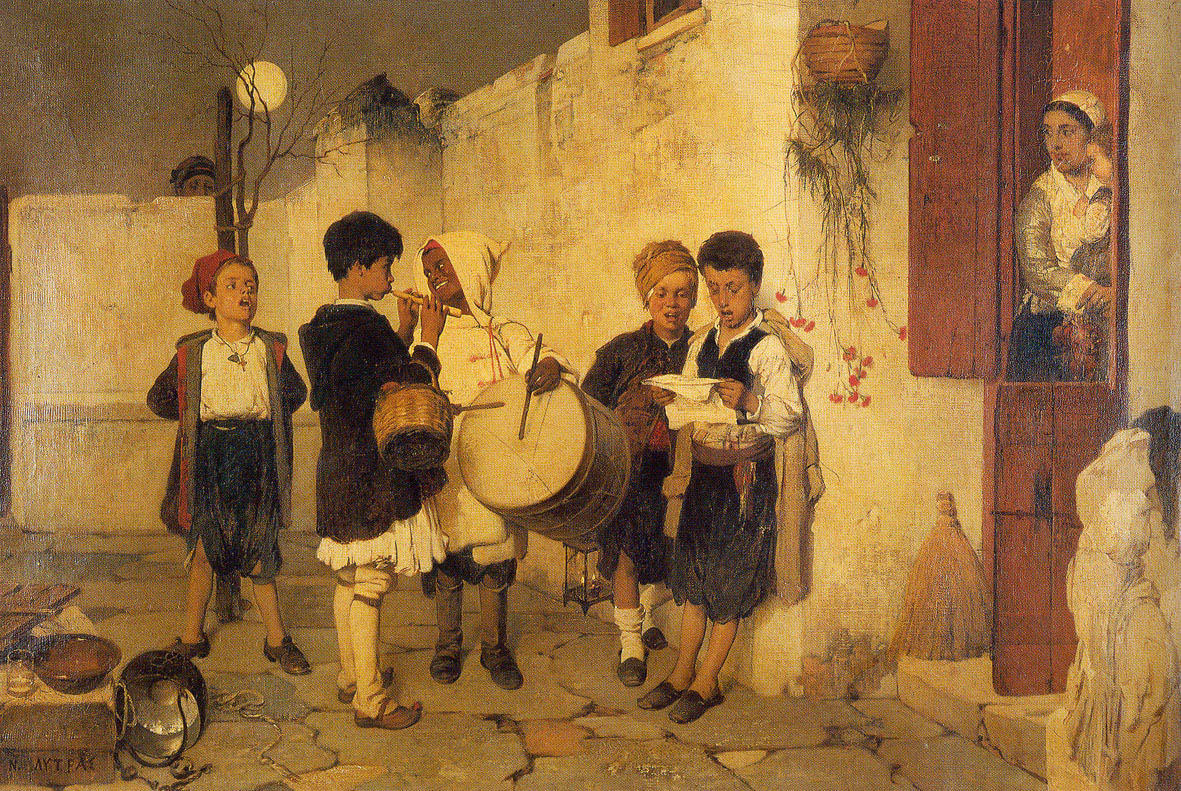
Carol by Nikephoros Lytras

Greek folklore is the folk tradition that has developed among the Greek people in and outside Greece over the centuries. Similarly to other European folklore, it includes pre-Christian pagan folklore, including elements of ancient Greek mythology which developed from the Indo-European religion and the local Pelasgian mythology, along with Christian myths and legends that developed during the Hellenistic, Roman and Medieval periods. It also shares elements with the folklore of Balkan countries, such as Albanian and Serbian folklore (and other southern Slavic mythology), as well as Anatolian folklore.

Greek folklore consists of demotic music, legends, traditions and customs. Greek folktales include Myrsina, Anthousa, Xanthousa, Chrysomalousa, How the dragon was tricked and others, while legends include those of the Nereids, the Kalikantzaros, the Lycanthrope and the Vrykolakas, which is similar to the Vampire of slavic folklore.

== Music and dance ==
Greek traditional music, or demotic music, varies by region in style, sound and rhythm and has evolved from Byzantine music tradition, which itself evolved from ancient Greek music. Common instruments are the Lyra, which is used by the Greeks of Pontus and Crete, the clarinet, which is used all over mainland Greece, as well as trumpets which are used mostly in the northern parts of the country, which has generally replaced the more traditional zournas. Bagpipes are also used in the regions of Macedonia and Thrace. Other instruments include forms of the floghera, which are common all over Greece, the Qanun which is used among Anatolian Greeks, the name of which comes from "κανών" ("kanon" rule, law), the toubeleki. Mirolóyia (laments, or mournful tunes) are mourful songs typically sang by older women in the regions of Epirus and Mani accompanied by no music. In other regions, such as Macedonia, they may only be music without any singing. In Epirus there also is a popular polyphonic tradition. The oldest Greek demotic song is the Dead brother's song, which dates back to the 9th century.

Dance in Megara

Each genre of traditional music is typically accompanied by a different dance. There are more than 10,000 folk dances from different regions of Greece, along with some pan-Hellenic dances that are catholic and known among all Greeks; although they might slightly differ by region. Most of the Greek dances are usually danced by groups in either a circle or a line, and might be for a specific gender only. Pan-Hellenic dances include Hasapiko (which originated in Constantinople but was later adopted by all Greeks), Syrtaki, Kalamatianos (which originated in southern Peloponnese), Zeibekiko (which originated in the Greek-inhabited regions of western Anatolia), and others; while known region-specific dances include Pentozali (a war dance danced by men in the island of Crete), Serra (a war dance from Pontus), Leventikos from Macedonia, Berati and Tsamikos from mainland Greece, Ikariotikos from Icaria, and others.

== Influence of ancient Greek mythology ==
The ancient Greek religion, mythology and folklore eventually developed into medieval and later modern Greek folklore and tradition. The Nymphs of ancient Greek mythology survived in modern Greek folklore as the Neraides (single: νεράιδα, neráida) who are the fairies of Greek folklore.The name nereids applied only to sea Nymphs, but now applies to all fairies of Greek tradition. Other creatures of Greek mythology, such as Lamia have also survived in modern Greek folklore and have many of the old characteristics and attributes. There are also various retellings of the story of Meleager. Aesop's fables have also survived in different ways and made their way into modern folklore.
