= European folklore =

Folklore of the Western world

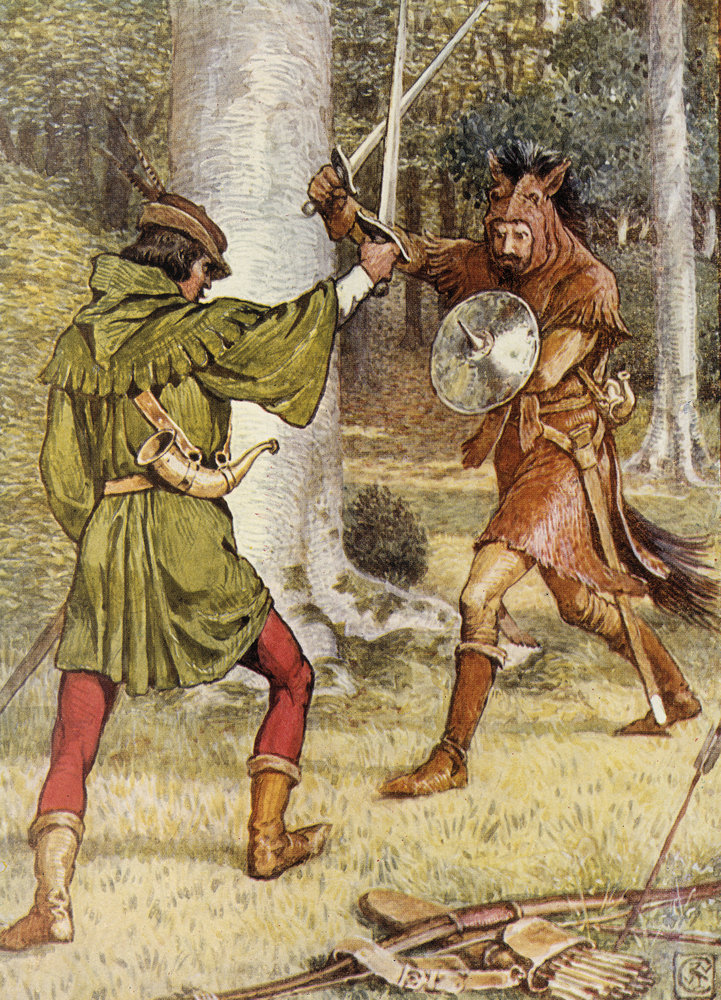
Robin Hood (left), one of the most famous characters in European folklore

European folklore or Western folklore refers to the folklore of the Western world, especially when discussed comparatively. The history of Christendom during the Early Modern period has resulted in a number of traditions that are shared in many European ethnic and regional cultures.

This concerns notably common traditions based on Christian mythology, i.e. certain commonalities in celebrating Christmas, such as the various Christmas gift-bringers, or customs associated with All Souls' Day.

In addition, there are certain apotropaic gestures or practices found in large parts of the Western world, such as the knocking on wood or the fingers crossed gesture.

== History ==
Many tropes of European folklore can be identified as stemming from the Proto-Indo-European peoples of the Neolithic and Bronze Age, although they may originate from even earlier traditions. Examples of this include the 'Chaoskampf' myth-archetype as well as possibly the belief in knocking on wood for good luck. The culture of Classical Antiquity, including mythology, Hellenistic religion and magical or cultic practice was very influential on the formative stage of Christianity, and can be found as a substrate in the traditions of all territories formerly colonized by Greeks and the Roman Empire, and by extension in those territories reached by Christianization during the Middle Ages. This includes all of Europe, and much of the Middle East and North Africa. These traditions inherited from folk beliefs in the Roman era were syncretized with local traditions, notably Germanic, Celtic and Slavic. Many folk traditions also originated by contact with the Islamic world, especially in the Balkans and in the Iberian Peninsula, which were ruled by Islamic empires before being re-conquered (in the case of the Balkans, partially) by Christian forces. The result of such cultural contact is visible e.g. in the tradition of the Morris Dance in England, an adaptation of the "moorish" dances of the late medieval period.

The result were the related, but regionally distinct, folk traditions as they existed in European society on the eve of the Early Modern period. In modern times, and especially since the 19th century, there has been much cross-pollination between these traditions, often by the detour of American folklore.

== Regional traditions ==
=== Northern Europe ===
- Baltic mythology
  - Estonian folklore
  - Latvian folklore
  - Lithuanian folklore
- British folklore
  - Matter of Britain
  - Celtic mythology
    - Hebridean mythology and folklore
    - Irish folklore
    - Manx folklore
    - Scottish folklore
    - Welsh folklore
  - English folklore
    - Anglo-Saxon paganism
    - Matter of England
- Dutch folklore
- Finnish folklore
- Nordic folklore
  - Edda
  - Saga

=== Western and Southern Europe ===
- Alpine folklore
- Folk Catholicism
- French folklore
  - Matter of France
  - Chanson de geste
- German folklore
- Ancient and Modern Greek folklore
- Italian folklore
  - Matter of Rome
- Portuguese folklore
- Spanish folklore
- Swiss folklore

=== Central and Eastern Europe ===
- Albanian folklore
- Folk Orthodoxy
- Georgian mythology
- Hungarian folklore
- Romanian folklore
- Slavic folklore
  - Bulgarian folklore
  - Czech folklore
  - Montenegrin folklore
  - Polish folklore and culture
  - Russian folklore
  - Serbian folklore
  - Ukrainian folklore

== See also ==
- American folklore
- Australian folklore
- Brazilian folklore
- Chivalric romance
- Crypto-paganism
- Ethnic groups in Europe
- European culture
- European mythology
- Sailors' superstitions
