= Timothy Gantz =

American classical scholar (1945–2004)

Timothy Nolan Gantz
- Born: December 23, 1945
- Died: January 20, 2004 (aged 58); Athens, Georgia, U.S.

Academic background
- Education: Haverford College (BA); Princeton University (PhD)

Timothy Nolan Gantz (23 December 1945 – 20 January 2004) was an American classical scholar and the author of Early Greek Myth: A Guide to Literary and Artistic Sources.

== Education and career ==
Gantz received his Bachelor of Arts from Haverford College in 1967, and his Ph.D. in Classics from Princeton University in 1970. From 1970, Gantz was a long-time professor of classics at the University of Georgia, where he directed its "Studies Abroad in Rome" program from 1985 to 2003.

== Early Greek Myth ==
In 1993, he published his book Early Greek Myth: A Guide to Literary and Artistic Sources, a compendium of Greek mythology and its sources, which puts particular emphasis on earlier sources of the Archaic period. The work's stated purpose was to study Greek myths with particular consideration for the surviving ancient sources we have for them, and for how the authors and artists who produced these sources may have themselves conceived of Greek myth. The book was received positively at the time of its publication, and in subsequent years, William Hansen has described it as an "[o]utstanding narrative survey of the texts and illustrations of early Greek myth and heroic legend", while Robin Hard has stated it "can be recommended unreservedly as a comprehensive guide to the early mythical tradition".

== Death ==
Gantz died in Athens, Georgia, on 20 January 2004, aged 58.

== Sources ==
- Gantz, Timothy (1993), Early Greek Myth: A Guide to Literary and Artistic Sources (1st ed.), Baltimore: Johns Hopkins University Press, ISBN 978-0-801-85360-9.
- Gantz, Timothy (1996), Early Greek Myth: A Guide to Literary and Artistic Sources (2nd ed.), Baltimore: Johns Hopkins University Press, ISBN 978-0-801-84410-2.
- Hansen, William (2004), Handbook of Classical Mythology, Santa Barbara: ABC-Clio, ISBN 978-1-576-07226-4.
- Hard, Robin (2004), The Routledge Handbook of Greek Mythology: Based on H.J. Rose's "Handbook of Greek Mythology" (7th ed.), London: Routledge, ISBN 978-0-415-18636-0.
- March, Jennifer R. (1996), "Review of Gantz (1993)", The Classical Review, 46 (1): 174–175, JSTOR 710886.
- Neils, Jenifer (1994), "Review of Gantz (1993)", Bryn Mawr Classical Review, 1994.04.14.
- "Obituary for Timothy Nolan Gantz, Professor of Classics" (PDF), The Georgia Classicist, XXV (I): 19–20, 2004, archived from the original (PDF) on 2006-08-22.
- Robertson, Noel (1995), "Review of Gantz (1993)", Échos du Monde Classique, XXXIX, n.s. 14: 275–276, ISSN 1913-5416.
