= Tenos (Thessaly) =

Tenos (Ancient Greek: Τήνῳς) was a town in ancient Thessaly, noted in ancient Greek folklore for a supposedly remarkable venomous snake and its equally remarkable demise. It is unlocated.
