= Bock (bagpipe) =

Central European musical instrument

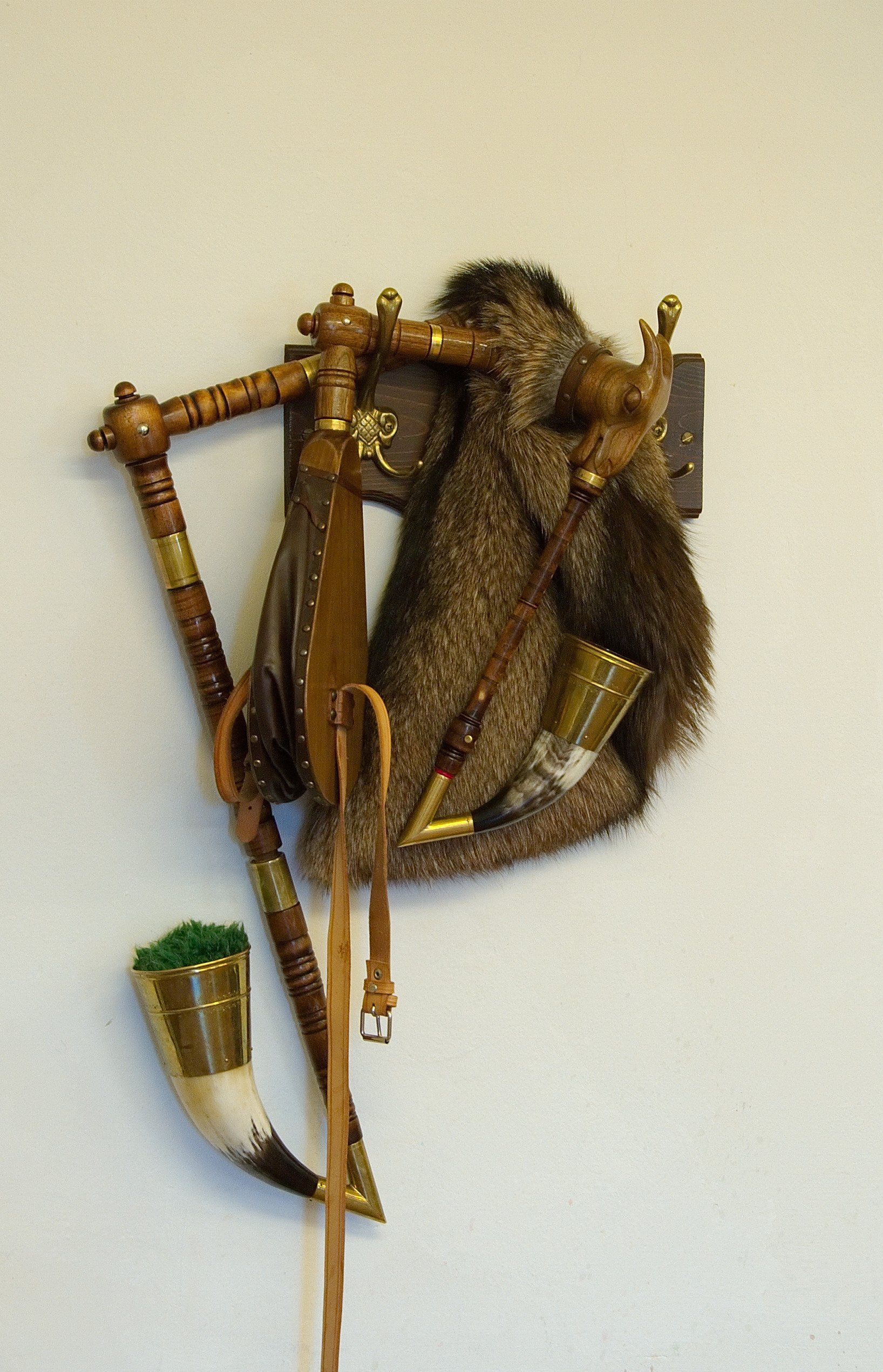
Bohemian-style Bock

Variants of the bock, a type of bagpipe, were played in Central Europe in what are the modern states of Austria, Germany, Poland and the Czech Republic. The tradition of playing the instrument endured into the 20th century, primarily in the Blata, Chodsko, and Egerland regions of Bohemia, and among the Sorbs of Saxony. The name "Bock" (German for buck, i.e. male goat) refers to the use of goatskins in constructing the bag, similar to the common use of other goat-terms for bagpipes in other nations, such as the French cabrette, Spanish gaita and Polish koza.

== History ==
The oldest written mentions of bagpipes in the Lands of the Bohemian Crown comes from Zbraslav Chronicle (lat. Chronicon Aulae regiae, 1335 - 1339). The earliest description of the mouth-blown Bock is illustrated on plate XI and described by Michael Praetorius in his treatise, Syntagma Musicum 2, De Organographia (Wolfenbüttel, 1619), plates issued separately as Theatrum Instrumentorum (1620).

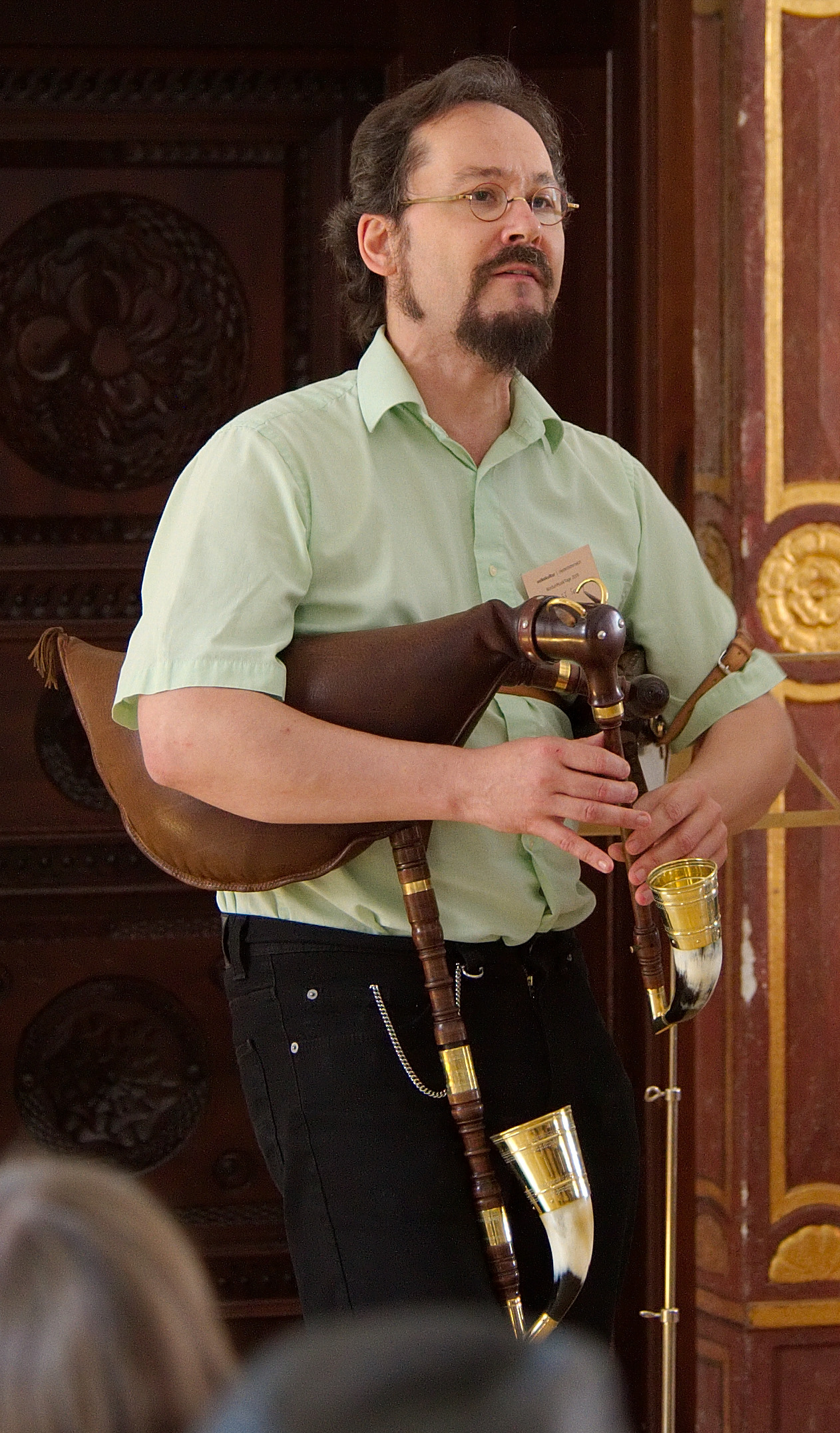
Tomáš Spurný playing an Egerland-style Bock

== Design ==
The drone of the Bock is usually pitched two octaves below the tonic of the chanter. The single drone and single chanter have cylindrical bores and employ single reeds. The current variant of the Bock is generally bellows-blown, which has the advantage of allowing the piper to sing along with their playing. These bellows-blown bagpipes are believed to have made their way into southern and western Bohemia in the first half of the 19th century.

The chanter and drone terminate in amplifying bells of horn or brass, angled upwards. The top end of the chanter is often shaped in the form of a goat-head. In Egerland-style instruments, the drone hangs downward from the bag, whereas in the Bohemian variant, the drone extends backwards over the player's shoulder.

== Makers and players ==
The instrument is now mainly played in the Czech Republic, particularly South Bohemia in Strakonice and in Western Bohemia around the town of Domažlice in the region known as Chodsko. As the instrument's revival continues, it is also gaining ground in Austria and Bavaria.

In Chodsko, one of the most famous makers of the Bock (or pukl in the local Chod dialect) was Bolfík Šteffek (1842–1923), who lived and worked in Újezd. His son, Vuk Šteffek, (1879–1966) carried on the tradition of making and repairing the pukl. Jakub Jahn (1902–1978), who lived in the village of Ždanov, made about 50 Bock bagpipes. Perhaps the most sought after are those made by Jakub Konrady (1905–1987) of Domažlice; Konrady made more than 200 examples, and his sons, Jaromír (born 1944) and Stanislav (born 1946), continue in the tradition. Other makers in western Bohemia include Lubomír Junbauer (born 1950) of Stod, and Jan Hloubek (born 1958) of Klenčí. The most prolific maker in the recent past is Miroslav Janovec of Malonice.

Notable players of the instrument include the American musician Wayne Hankin, who has used it in the recordings of Meredith Monk.

== See also ==
- Duda
