= William Hansen (classicist) =

American classical philologist

- Born: 1941 (age 84–85)

Academic background
- Education: University of California, Berkeley (BA, PhD)

Academic work
- Discipline: Classics
- Sub-discipline: Folklore
- Institutions: Indiana University Bloomington; American Folklore Society; Folklore Institute

William Hansen (born 1941) is an American academic who is a professor emeritus of classical studies and folklore at Indiana University Bloomington.

== Education and career ==
Hansen earned a Bachelor of Arts degree in 1965 and his PhD in 1970 from the University of California, Berkeley in classical studies.

== Career ==
In 1970, Hansen began his employment as an assistant professor in the Department of Classical Studies at Indiana University Bloomington, where also accepted an appointment as a fellow of the Folklore Institute. He became a professor of classical studies in 1985 and of folklore in 1992. Hansen retired from Indiana University Bloomington in 2005. He was named as a fellow of the American Folklore Society in 2010.

Hansen is known for publishing the first English translation of Phlegon of Tralles. He has also edited multiple collections of classical mythology and authored several works concerning Ancient Greek folklore and Roman folklore. Hansen's most recent book, The Book of Greek & Roman Folktales, Legends & Myths, is an anthology of lesser known narratives from the folklore of classical antiquity.

== Books ==
- The Conference Sequence: Patterned Narration and Narrative Inconsistency in the Odyssey, 1972.
- Saxo Grammaticus and the Life of Hamlet: History, Translation, and Commentary, 1983.
- Phlegon of Tralles’ Book of Marvels, 1996.
- Anthology of Ancient Greek Popular Literature,1998.
- Ariadne’s Thread: A Guide to International Tales Found in Classical Literature, 2002.
- Myth: A New Symposium (co-edited with Gregory Schrempp), 2002.
- Handbook of Classical Mythology, 2004.
- Classical Mythology: A Guide to the Mythical World of the Greeks and Romans, 2005.
- Anonymous: Life of Aesop. Bryn Mawr Greek Commentaries, 2008.
- The Book of Greek and Roman Folktales, Legends, and Myths, 2017.
- Classical Myth and Literature in Parody: Ancient and Modern, 2026
