= Greek musical instruments =

Greek musical instruments were grouped under the general term "all developments from the original construction of a tortoise shell with two branching horns, having also a cross piece to which the stringser from an original three to ten or even more in the later period, like the Byzantine era". Greek musical instruments can be classified into the following categories:

== Ancient ==
- Aulos
- Barbiton
- Chelys
- Cithara (or Kithara)
- Crotalum
- Epigonion
- Harp
- Kanonaki
- Kymbalon
- Lyre
- Pan flute (Syrinx)
- Pandura
- Phorminx
- Rhoptron
- Sambuca
- Salpinx
- Sistrum
- Psaltery
- Tambourine
- Trigonon
- Water organ (Hydraulis)
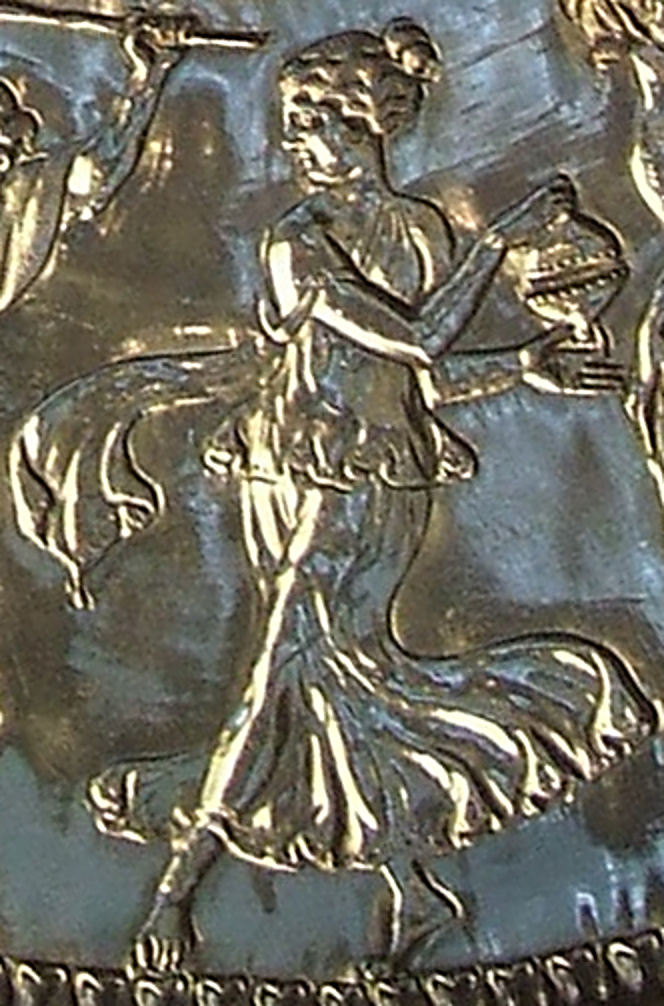
Roman art, 4th century A.D. Dancer with kymbalon.

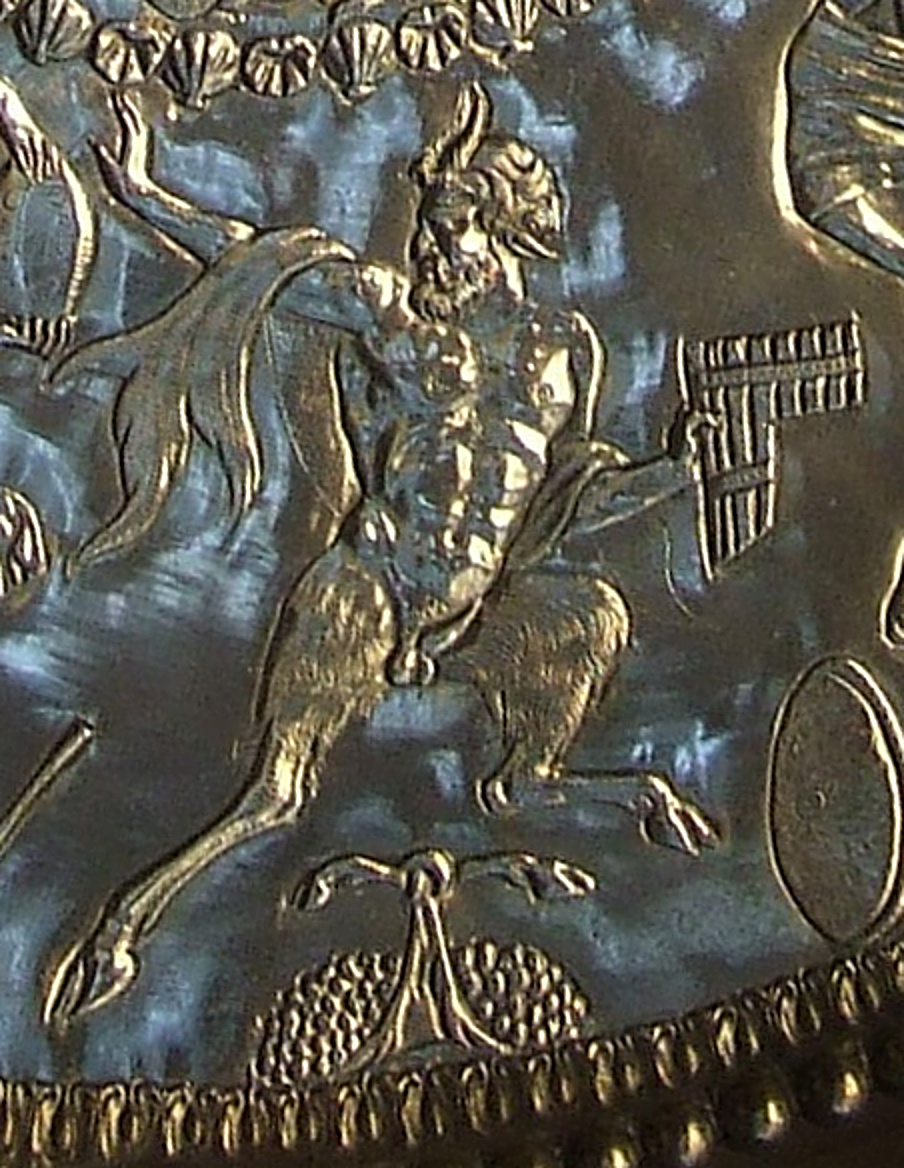
Mildenhall treasure, great dish, British Museum, detail-- satyr with pan pipes

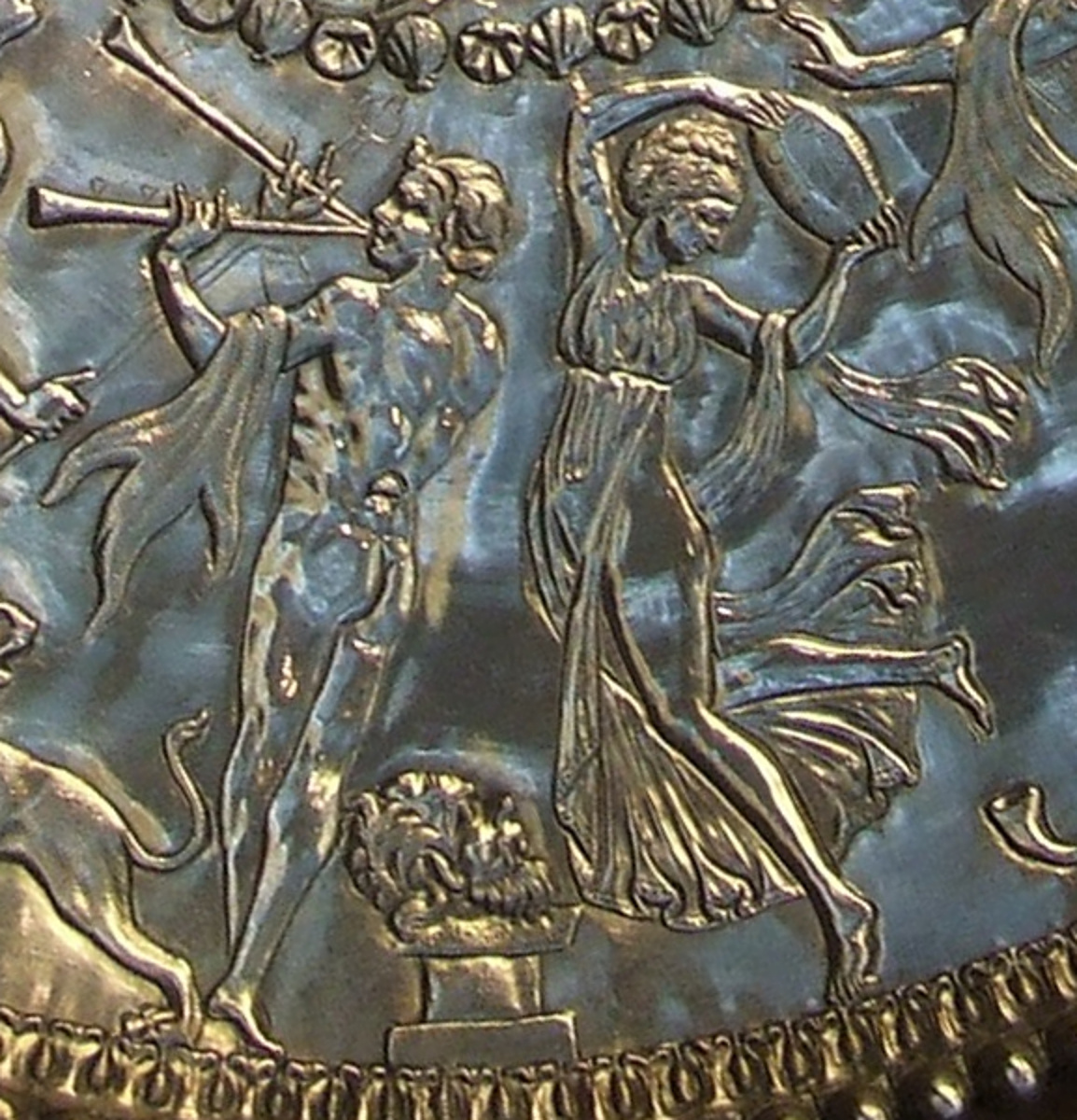
Mildenhall treasure, great dish, British Museum, detail-- aulos and tambourine

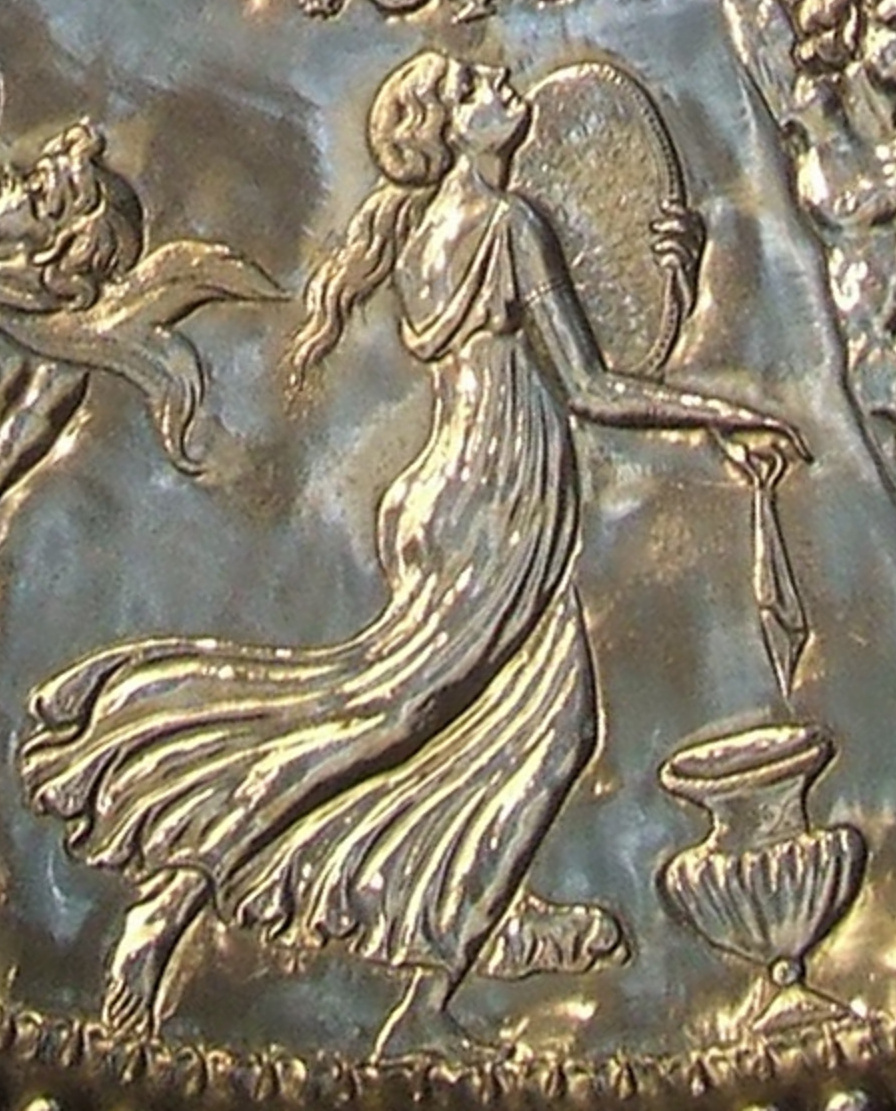
Mildenhall treasure, great dish, British Museum, frame drum

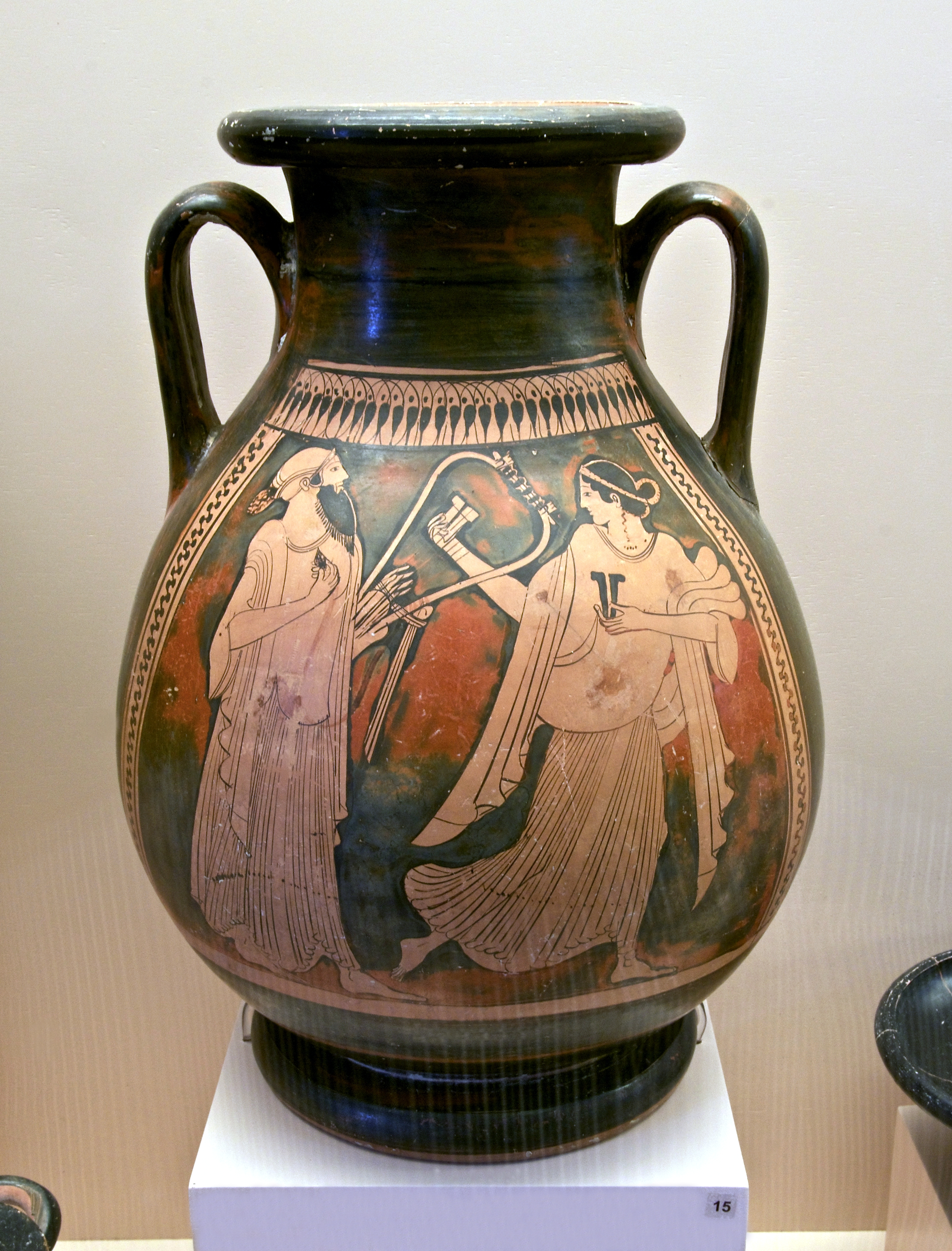
Afterlife scene of a woman playing crotalum clappers leading a man playing a barbitos lyre.

== Medieval and modern ==
=== String instruments ===
- Baglamas
- Byzantine lyra
- Bouzouki
- Cretan lyra
- Calabrian lira
- Guitar
- Kanonaki
- Mandolin
- Mandola
- Oudola
- Oud
- Psaltery
- Politiki lyra (Constantinople lyra)
- Santouri
- Laouto (big and small)
- Lavta (Politiko laouto)
- One stringed lyra (rare)
- Macedonian lyra
- Pontian lyra
- Violin
- Tzouras
- Tambouras
- Thaboura
- Karantouzeni
- Bağlama

=== Aerophones ===
- Askomandoura
- Aulos
- Floghera
- Gaida
- Karamuza
- Klarino
- Lalitsa
- Mantura
- Souravli (Thiamboli)
- Tsampouna
- Zurna

=== Percussion instruments ===
- Cochilia
- Crotala
- Daouli
- Koudounia
- Toubeleki
- Trigono
- Tympano
- Zilia

== See also ==
- Music of Greece
- Greek dances
- Greek folk music
