= Cochilia =

The Chochilia (Greek: κοχύλια), are a kind of a Greek traditional auxiliary percussion instrument. They are shells from the sea, which become auxiliary musical instruments with the appropriate processing. Each chochilia has its own musical tone. Those small shells also called ostraka (Greek: όστρακα) are plentiful in Greek islands.

== See also ==
- Greek musical instruments
- Greek folk music
