= Dankiyo =

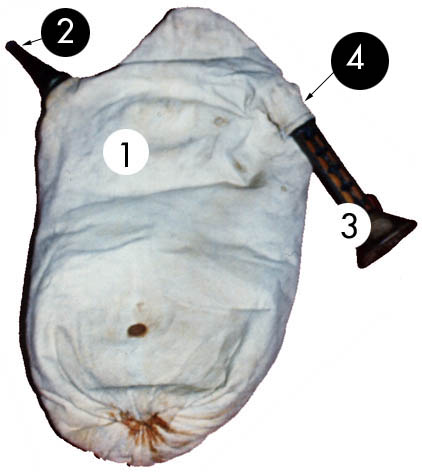
- A Dankiyo (Pontic bagpipe)

aerophone
- Classification: Bagpipes, Aerophone
- Hornbostel–Sachs classification: 422.112
- Inventor(s): Traditional instrument of the Pontic Greeks
- Developed: Pontus, Ottoman Empire (documented 17th century)
- Timbre: Continuous drone with melodic chanter

Related instruments
- Tulum (instrument), Tsampouna, Askomandoura, Gaida

Musicians
- Used in folk music of Pontic Greeks and Laz people

Dankiyo (from ancient Greek: To angeion (Τὸ ἀγγεῖον)), is an ancient word from the text of Evliya Çelebi (17th century, Ottoman Era "The Laz's of Trebizond invented a bagpipe called a dankiyo..." describing the Pontian tulum, a type of bagpipe which the ancient Greeks called an askaulos (ἀσκός askos – wine-skin, αὐλός aulos – flute). It consists of a lamb skin, a blow pipe, and the double reed chanter.

The dankiyo is played in small villages near Trabzon and Rize. A similar type of bagpipe can be found on the islands of Greece with different names like Tsampouna or Askomandoura. Its use is also widespread in the region of Macedonia in Northern Greece amongst Pontian Greek populations. What differentiates the dankiyo from other bagpipes is that the dankiyo does not use a separate pipe for the drone. Instead, the sound is created by two reeds in the chanter.

== Etymology ==
Ancient Greek: To angeion (Τὸ ἀγγεῖον) "the vessel". Can also be interpreted as "the container".

== Parts of the instrument ==
The Pontian Touloum is made up of these parts:

1. Aulos - flute : Wood & Reeds (ancient Greek instrument}
2. Post - Skin (bag) : Animal Skin
3. Fisaktir - blowpipe : Wood or Bone
4. Kalame - Reeds: Reeds
