= Pilai =

Type of Finnish bagpipe

The pilai is a type of Finnish bagpipe, described as "primitive", and as being similar to the Russian volynka. A 1796 texts describes it as "the last of the Russian wind instruments" but noted it "appertains properly to the Finns". The same text describes it as being made with a mouthpiece, two pipes, and an undressed goatskin.

A traveler named Matthew Guthrie wrote in 1795 (cited by the organologist Anthony Baines):

Volynka is the name given by the Russians to the bagpipe, who use it in some provinces, but it seems much more the appropriate instrument of the Finns… who have no other, where it is called pilai… with only two pipes independent of the inflating tube just as first imported into the Scottish Isles from the shores of the Baltic by the northern rovers, who often visited them… The Finnish bagpipe is still made now as then as undressed Goat Skin with the hair on it as is presented in our plate, and of course cannot scent very sweet, nor can we take it upon us to say that the music of this Mother Bagpipe is much sweeter than the smell.
