= Lalitsa =

The lalitsa (Greek: λαλίτσα) is a wind-blown musical instrument of Greece, widely used in Greek folk music. The flute it is Vessel flute, much like the floghera, though lalitses themselves have no finger holes.

== See also ==
- Greek musical instruments
- Greek folk music
- Greek music
