= Berikaoba =

Georgian folk theatre

Berikaoba ბერიკაობა
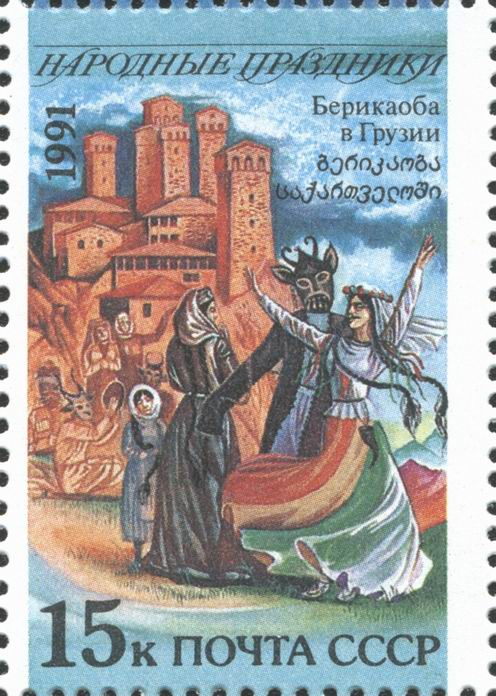
- A berikaoba scene on a Soviet stamp from 1991
- Status: Active
- Genre: Festival
- Country: Georgia
- Major events: Improvised masqueraded folk theatre

Berikaoba (Georgian: ბერიკაობა) is an improvised masqueraded folk theatre in Georgia, stemming from the pagan festivity of fertility and rebirth. The name is derived from a Common Kartvelian root ber (ბერ), meaning "a child". The scenes of Berikaoba range from those of explicitly erotic nature to political satire and social protest.

Berikaoba typically involves several men, the berika, who are mostly disguised as animals. The costumes and masks for the mystery are made of animal hide. Animal skulls, tails, feathers, horns, pumpkins, ribbons and bells are used to add colorfulness to the scene. The festivity begins with a gathering of villagers who chose actors for the mystery. The procession of berikas – accompanied by sounds of bagpipes (stviri) – move door-to-door to pick wine, honey, floor, meat and other victuals served by hosts. The main characters in the procession are a "bride" called Kekela (კეკელა) and a groom who, after a series of attempts, persuades Kekela to marry him. The wedding is then disrupted by an appearance of a "Tatar", a reference to the centuries of invasions from neighboring Muslim powers. The groom is killed and the people console Kekela, promising her a better husband. As berikas try to resuscitate the groom with help of healing water, herbs and minerals, the news spreads about the abduction of Kekela. This brings the groom back to life. He chases the kidnappers and relieves her bride. The performance finishes with a lengthy feast, supra.

The similar tradition, keenoba (ყეენობა, from "the Khan"), satirizing the foreign invaders of Georgia and later the Imperial Russian officialdom, enjoyed particular popularity in the 19th-century Tbilisi and its environs. The tradition of berikaoba was inscribed on the Intangible Cultural Heritage of Georgia list in 2013.
