= Tumyr =

Mari drums

Tumyr (Mari: тумыр) or tyumyr (тюмыр) are a type of Mari two-sided drums. The Mari shyuvr (bagpipe) is almost always played with the tumyr.
