= Mantura =

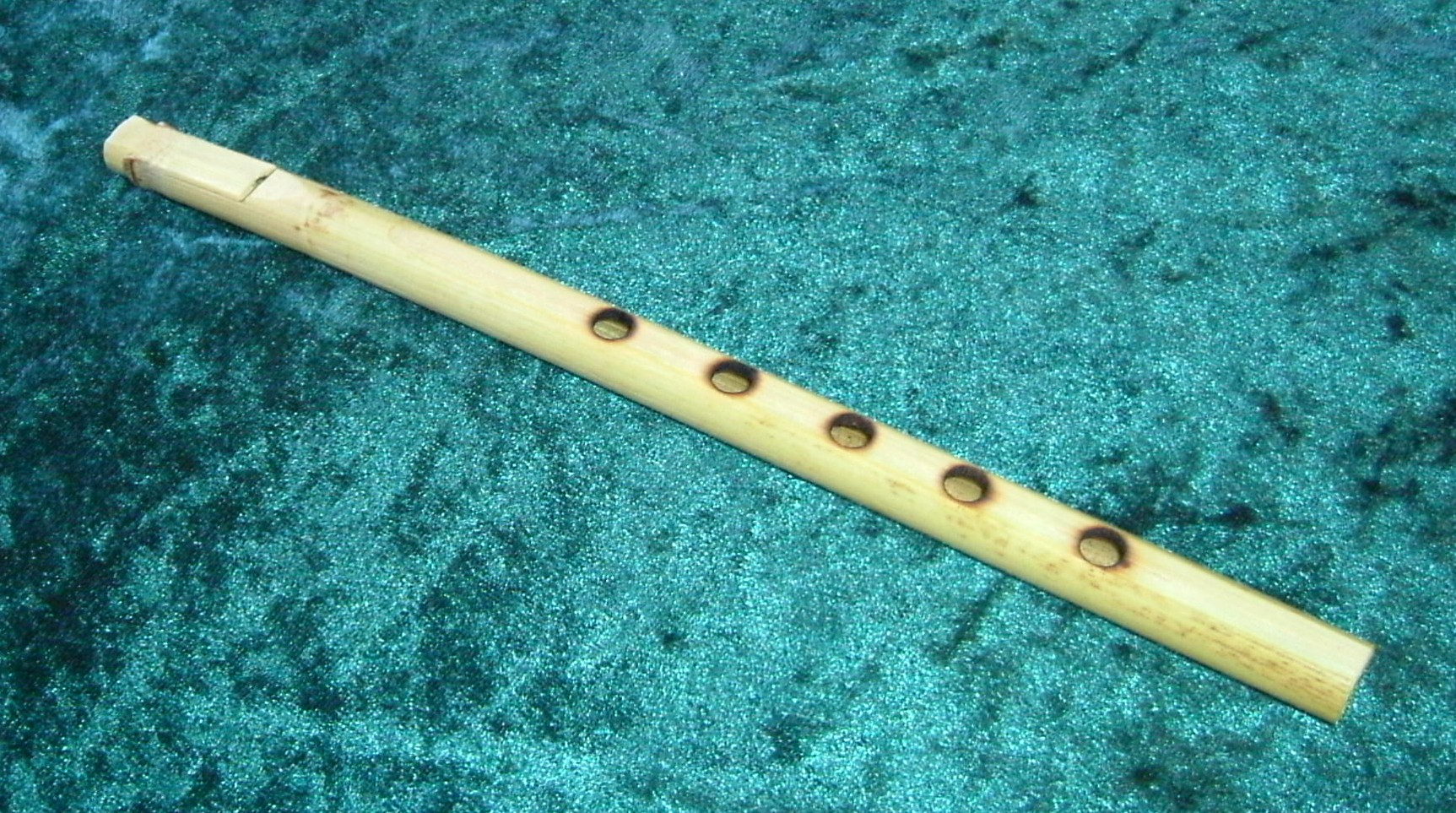
A mandoura reed pipe from Crete.

The mandoura or mantoura (Greek: μαντούρα, pronounced [maˈnduɾa]), is a Greek wind musical instrument made of reed, it is typically played in Crete and other Greek islands. It has 4 to 6 holes for the fingers and produces sound with the help of the reed (created by a split in the top end of the sidewall that vibrates creating the sound). It is also most likely a descendant of the ancient Greek aulos, though it differs in that it is a single-reed pipe, as opposed to the double-reed configuration of the aulos. The mandoura is much smaller in size compared to the aulos, typically around 20 cm to 25 cm in length. The reed is cut from the bottom of the plant, where there is no hole. It is then shaped, and a slit is made to form the tongue that creates the sound at the top end of the pipe.

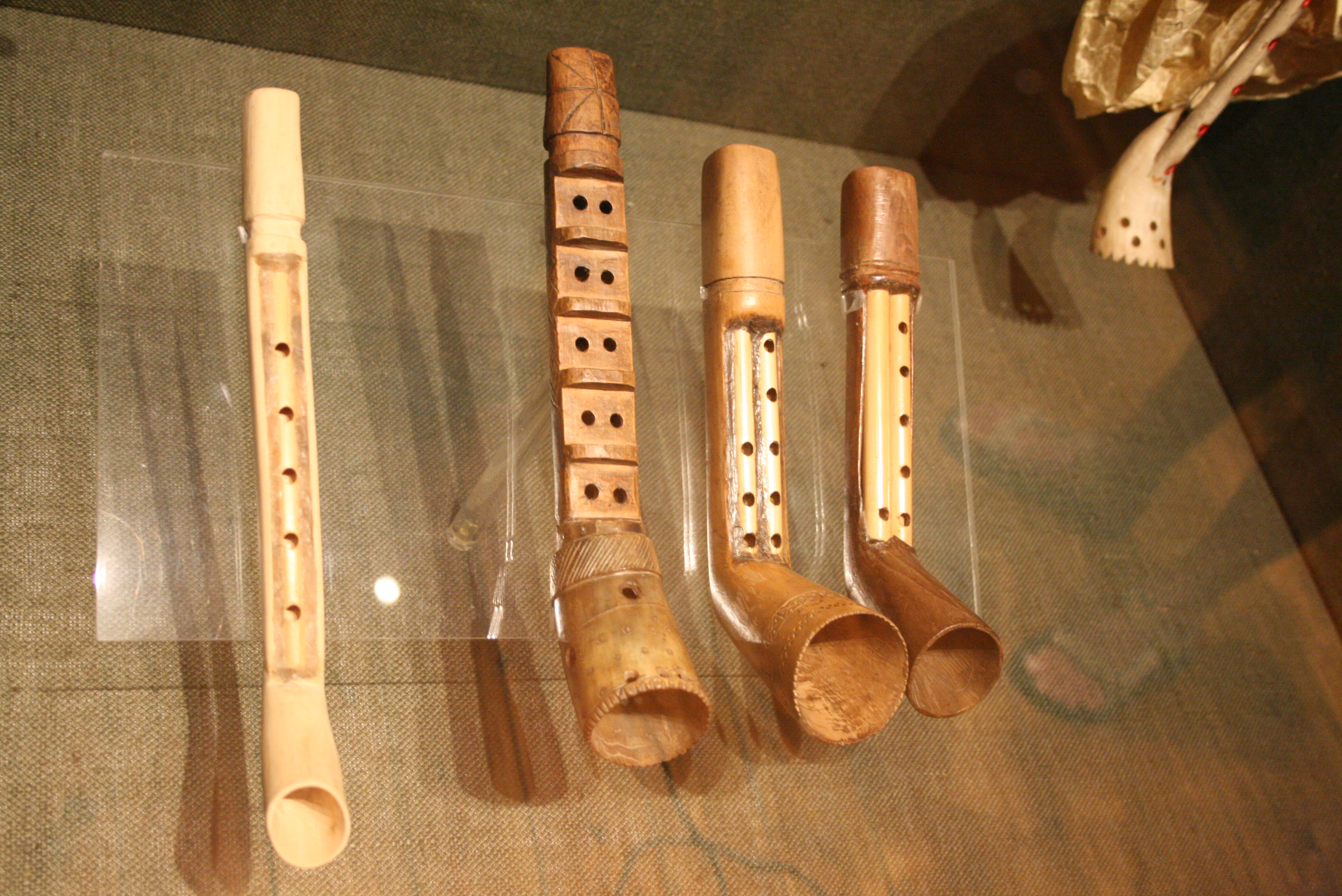
The Askomandoura is a bagpipe that uses two mandoura reed pipes inside a cylinder (the cylinder pipes shown above have two mandoura reed pipes inside) designed to be attached to a bag as part of the instrument.

== See also ==
- Askomandoura
- Greek musical instruments
- Greek folk music
- Greek music
