= Thaboura =

Greek musical instrument

The thaboura (Greek: θαμπούρα), is a type of a string instrument, evolved from the Greek musical instrument tambouras. It is bigger than tambouras and it has 3 strings or 3 pairs of strings. The thaboura's history stretches back to the Byzantine culture and originated in the medieval Greece times. It is also known as Thabouri ("θαμπούρι"), Thavouri ("θαβούρι") and Thavoura ("θαβούρα").

== See also ==
- Greek musical instruments
- Greek folk music
- Greek music
