= Karantouzeni =

The karantouzeni (Greek: καραντουζένι) is a stringed instrument of the lute family resembling the tambouras, although larger and possessing four strings. It is used in the rebetiko genre, a synthesis of the disparate remnants of urban Byzantine culture that was in many places subsumed by the predominant Turkish culture of the Ottoman Empire. It is usually tuned in the Ntouzeni (Greek: ντουζένι) style, much like the bouzouki, another pre-Ottoman revival instrument associated with the rebetiko movement.

== See also ==
- Greek musical instruments
- Greek folk music
- Greek music
