= Karamuza =

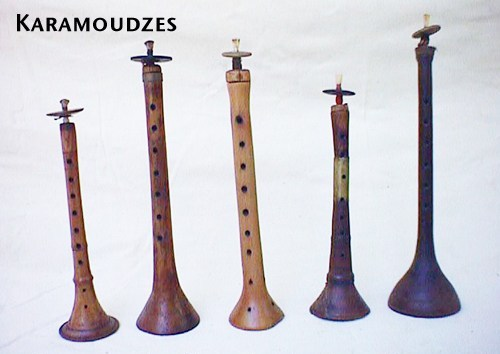
- Classification: Double reed

Related instruments
- Launeddas · Sorna · Rhaita · Suona; Sopila · Shawm · Zampogna · Zurna

The karamuza (Greek: καραμούζα), is a type of Greek reed instrument, likely having descended from the aulos, a common instrument of ancient Greece and Rome. It is made from wood, with a typical length of about 60 cm. The karamuza was extant in Greek music long before the import of the klarino, and its usage is ubiquitous in Greek folk music, particularly in Thessalia, the Peloponnese, and Macedonia.

== See also ==
- Aulos
- Greek musical instruments
- Greek folk music
- Greek music
