= Souravli =

Greek fipple flute

The souravli (Greek: σουραύλι; Cretan Greek: θιαμπόλι thiamboli, or φιαμπόλι fiamboli; Cypriot Greek: πιθκιαύλιν "pithkiavlin") is a Greek folk instrument, a type of a fipple flute made of reed or wood. It has a 2 octave ambitus.

A double flute is called a disavli (δισαύλι), one with no holes and the other one having holes to play the melody.

In Cyclades, the souravli is very widespread, especially in the Greek island of Naxos.

== See also ==
- Greek musical instruments
- Cretan lyra
- Naxos
