= Roman folklore =

Folklore in ancient Rome

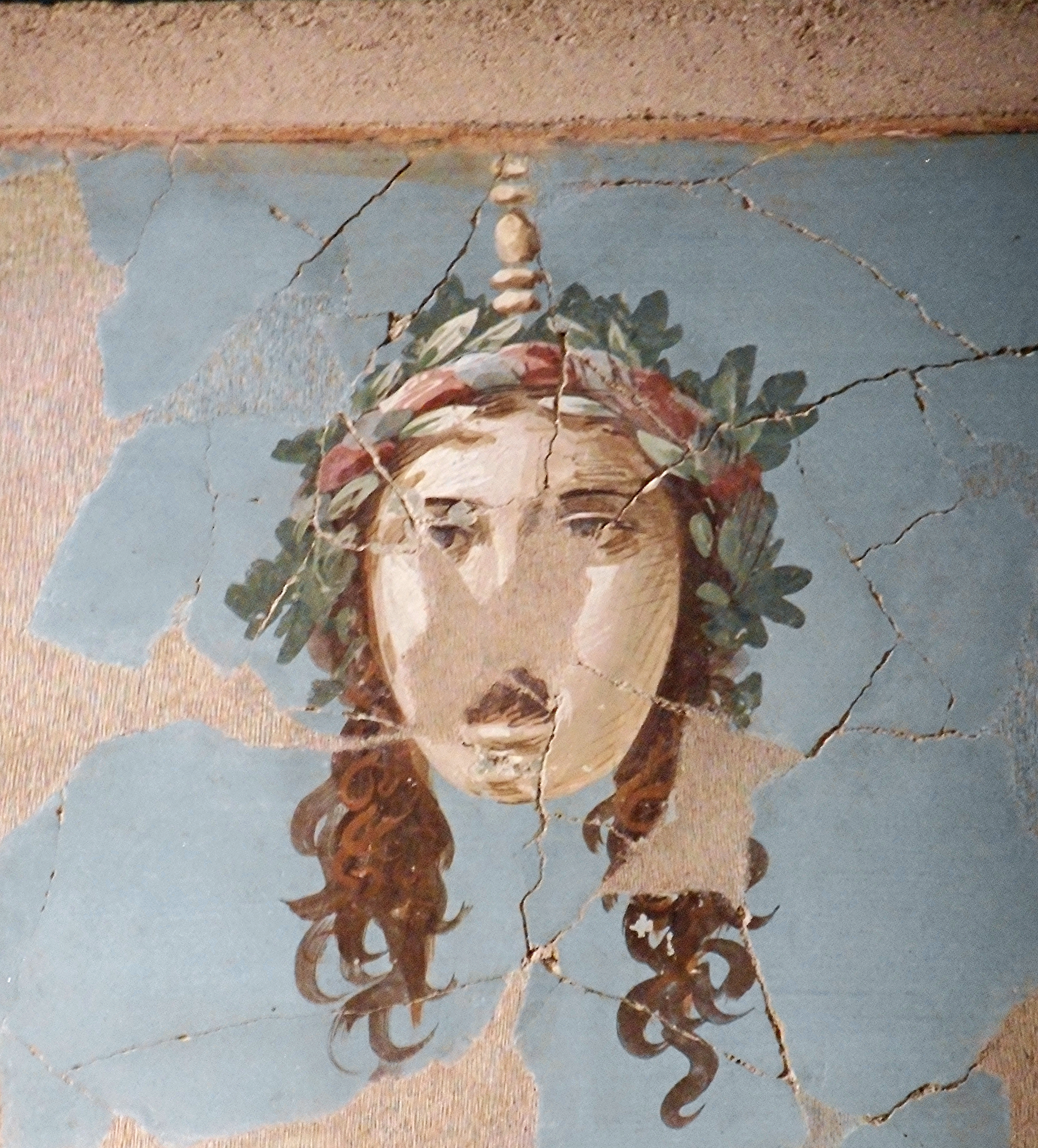
Theatrical mask (Detail) - Garden painting (30–35 AD) from Pompeii, House of the Golden Bracelet

Roman folklore is the folklore of ancient Rome, including genres such as myth (Roman mythology), legend, joke, charms, fable, ghostlore, and numerous others. Scholars have published various collections focused on ancient Rome's folklore. Roman folklore is closely related to Ancient Greek folklore and precedes Italian folklore.
