= Wayne Hankin =

American musician

Wayne Hankin is an American musician, conductor and composer. He is known for his performance in early music, theater, and creation of musical compositions for unusual instruments. He also developed a speech-producing method for throat cancer patients.

== Early life ==
Hankin was born in Baltimore, Maryland. His father, Sheldon James Hankins was a salesman; his mother Bette Jane Hankin was a mezzo-soprano with the Baltimore Opera Company, where she was apprenticed under Rosa Ponselle. Hankin received secondary education from The Park School, obtained his bachelor's degree in Music History at the Hartt College of Music and a master's degree in Early Music Performance Practice at the New England Conservatory. His principal teachers were Jack Ramey, Shelley Gruskin, Daniel Pinkham, Nancy Joyce, David Hart, Michael Schneider, and Mattius Maute.

== Career ==
In 1980 Hankin moved to Europe and settled in West Berlin, performing in concert halls, radio, television and theater. He served with several early music ensembles. He collaborated with instrument makers commissioning obscure instruments such as string drums (used alongside the tabor pipe) and chromatic jaw's harps. Over the next 20 years, he expanded his instrument collection to over 400 items and composed music specifically for them. In Berlin he worked with Meredith Monk at the Schaubühne am Lehliner Platz (Dir. Peter Stein) and became her music director for over 15 years.

In 1986 he returned to the US and settled in New York, where he performed with artists Arif Mardin and Julie Taymor. He was a soloist with numerous period ensembles, most notably Early Music New York and Piffarro. In 1991, Hankin made his conducting debut with the Houston Grand Opera performing Ms. Monk's Atlas, and continued to conduct in Europe and America. Throughout the 1990s he directed music at regional theaters such as Long Wharf Theater, Center Stage and the Alley Theater. In 2001, Hankin joined Cirque du Soleil and toured for over four years, after which he worked for the organization in other departments and in film and television.

Hankin has written more than 300 pieces of music. His best-known compositions include "Salmon Springtime", composed for 18 chromatic trumps (Jews harps), and "The Spirit Shall Return", for two sopranos and a chamber ensemble. Other works utilized lesser known instruments, including shawms, dulcians, crumhorns, rauspfieffes, renaissance flutes, recorders, gemshorns, western bagpipes and other period instruments.

== The Striking Voice ==
Hankin has also worked on non-musical activities. In 2008, he was given a pilot program at Johns Hopkins Medical Center, under the direction of Dr. Joseph Califano and speech therapist Kim Webster, to work with mostly throat cancer patients. He developed the Striking Voice, a method of recreating speech by means of a musical instrument (trump).

== Filmography ==
Year	Title		
1988	Book of Days	traveling musician	
2000	Titus	musician	uncredited
2002	Cirque du Soleil: Fire Within	himself	
2003	Cirque du Soleil Varekai	Schwande	
2003	Cirque du Soleil Solestrom	musician	uncredited
2004	Miss Spider Sunny Patch Friends The Princess & the Bee	musician	uncredited
2004	Miss Spider's Froggy Day in Sunny Park	musician	uncredited
2004	Resident Evil: Apocalypse	musician	uncredited
2007	Disney Princess Enchanted Tales	musician	uncredited
2010	7 Solos	Wanderman	winner best short subject, World Music & Independent Film Festival
2011	Breaking Bad (season 4)	musician	uncredited
2012	SAFE	musician	uncredited
2014	The Lego Movie	musician	uncredited
2014	Anesthesia	musician	
