= Koudounia =

The Koudounia (Greek: κουδούνια), are bell-like percussion instruments. Most often, they are made from copper and upon playing (that is, hitting them with a stick) they give out a special ringing sound. Originally the koudounia had been used as an amulet which protected the animals from evil spirits. Later, the koudounia became an auxiliary musical instrument.

== See also ==
- Greek musical instruments
- Greek folk music
