= Tsampouna =

Greek traditional music instrument

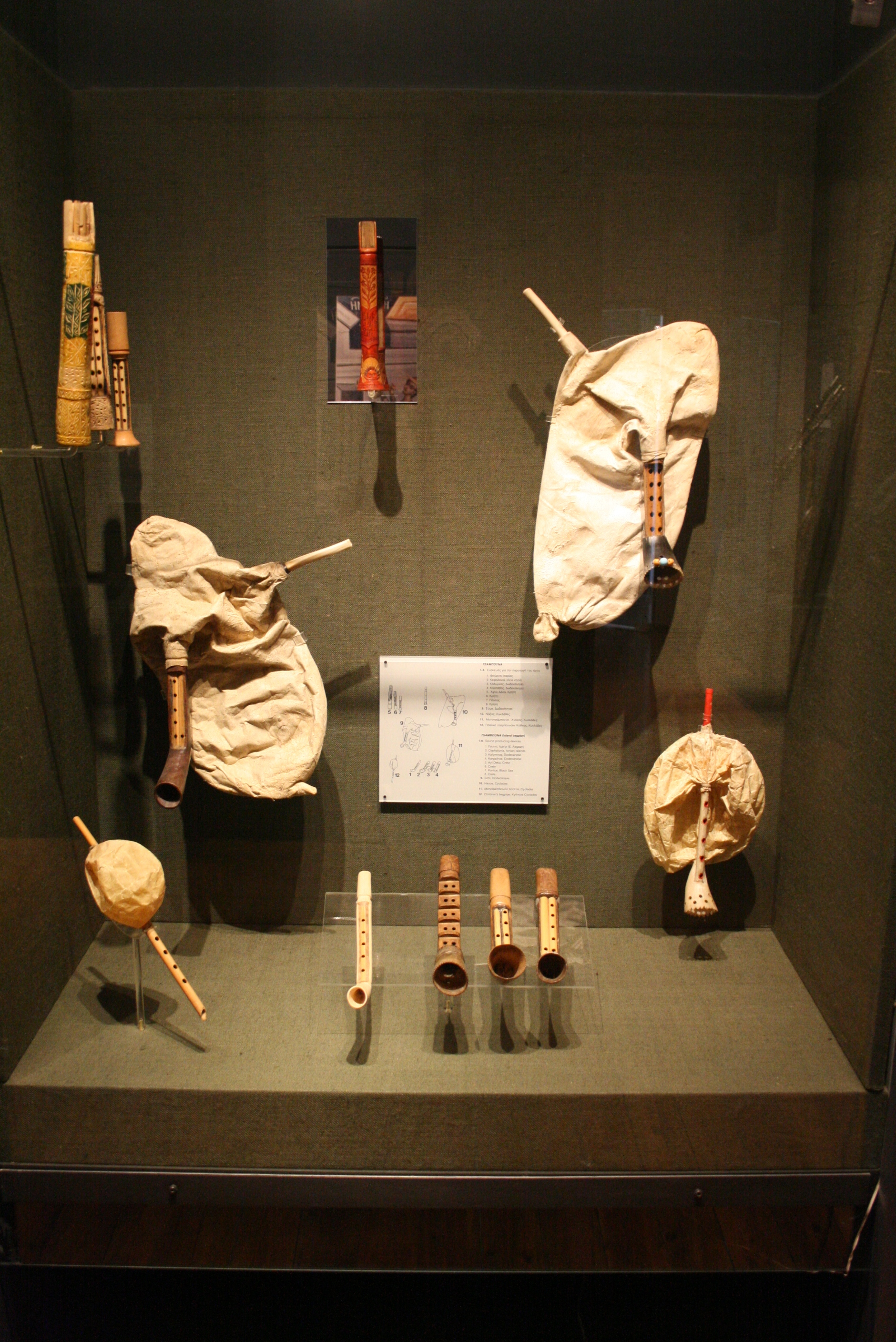
Various tsampounas from the Cyclades and Dodecanese islands

The tsampouna (or tsambouna; Greek: τσαμπούνα) is a Greek musical instrument and part of the bagpipe family. It is a double-chantered bagpipe, with no drone, and is inflated by blowing by mouth into a goatskin bag. The instrument is widespread in the Greek islands. The word is a reborrowing of zampogna, the word for the Italian double chantered pipes. Tsampouna is etymologically related to the Greek sumfōnia (Greek: συμφωνία), meaning "concord or unison of sound" (from σῠν- sun-, "with, together" + φωνή phōnḗ, "sound") and applied later to a type of bagpipe.

While many bagpipes throughout Europe have experienced renewed interest in the 20th century (often after long decline or extinction), in 2006 ethnomusicologist Wolf Dietrich noted: "Greece seems to be the only country in Europe which today has no bagpipe revival." However, a partial revival in the use of the tsampouna is occurring among traditional musicians on the island of Ikaria. Where, in recent years, it has become increasingly common for the tsampouna to be played at Ikarian festivals.

== Current revival ==
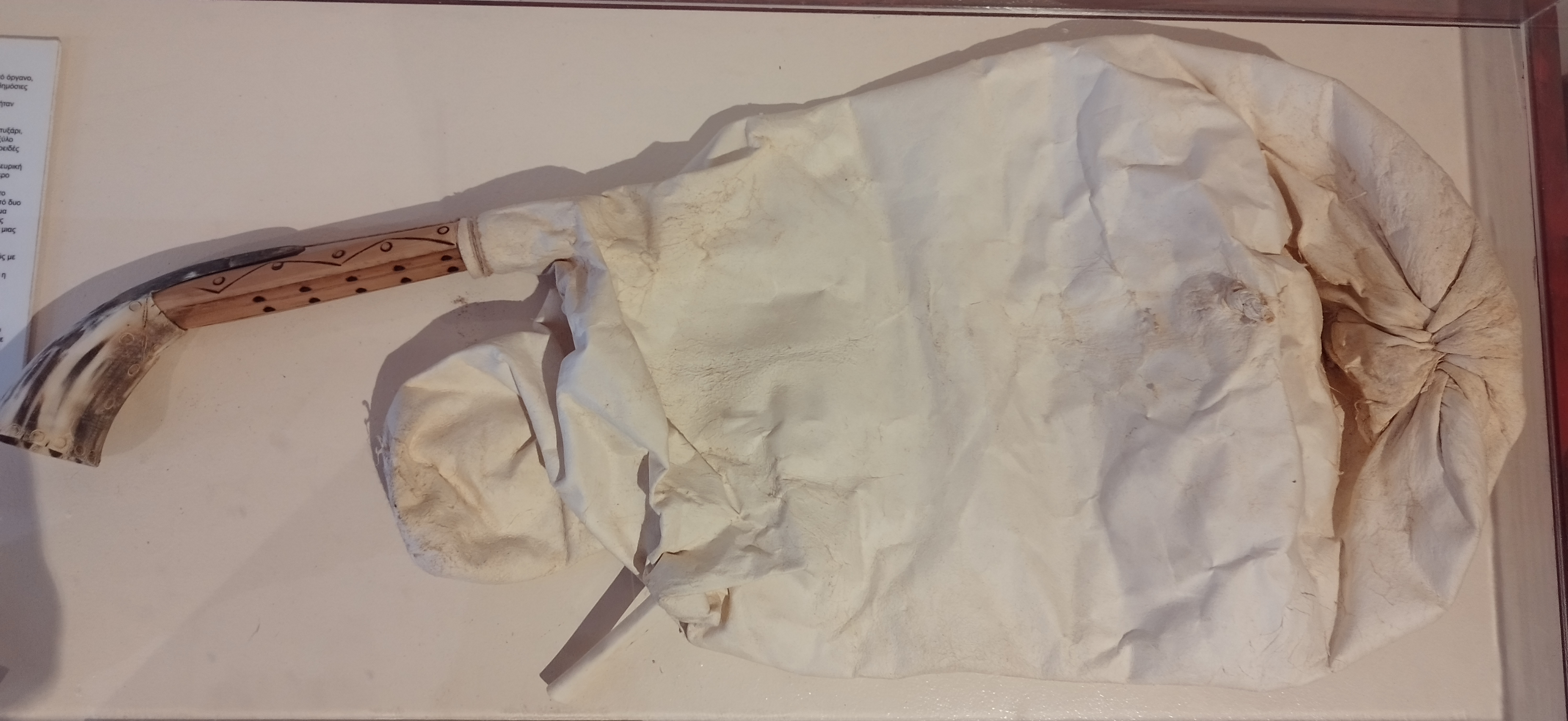
A modern reconstruction of an "askaulos" (tsampouna) in Kotsanas Museum of Ancient Greek Technology, Athens, Greece.

In the 21st century, interest in the tsampouna is growing and re-oriented. Although its tradition emerged from a now obsolete social context, current reality is giving birth to a new tradition. New musicians, a new audience, new terms of listening, a new repertoire along with the old one, and, most important, new or ever-timely messages, form the framework within which an old instrument remains alive and even gains popularity. This new tradition goes side by side with the old one that is still carried on, and is inspired by it. At the same time it breaks the latter's closer bond with local communities, transforming the tsabouna music from a set of local dialects into a lingua franca.

== See also ==
- Greek musical instruments
- Askomandoura
- Gaida
- Dankiyo
- Mizwad
