= Toubeleki =

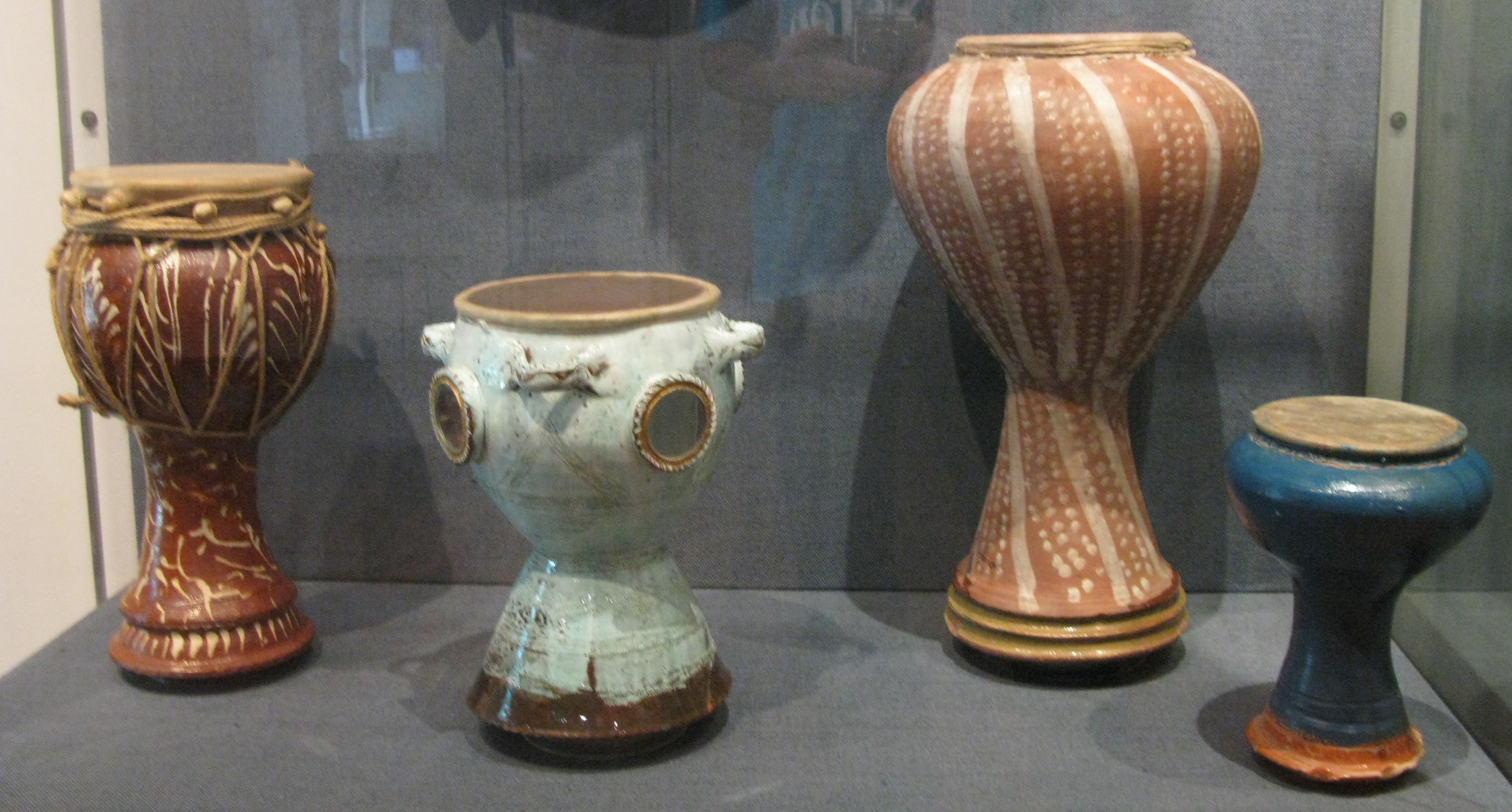

Percussion instrument
- Other names: chalice drum, tarabuka, tarabaki, darbuka, debuka, doumbek, dumbec, dumbeg, dumbelek, tablah, toumperleki, zerbaghali
- Classification: hand percussion

The toubeleki (Greek: τουμπελέκι and τουμπερλέκι and ντουμπελέκι), is a kind of a Greek traditional drum musical instrument. It is usually made from metal, open at its downside and covered with a skin stretched over it. It is played with the hands and used often in the Greek traditional folk rhythms, for the particularly cover of the Greek laiko and rebetiko music.

== See also ==
- Greek musical instruments
- Greek folk music
- Greek music
- Goblet drum
