= Ancient Greek folklore =

Folklore of the ancient Greeks

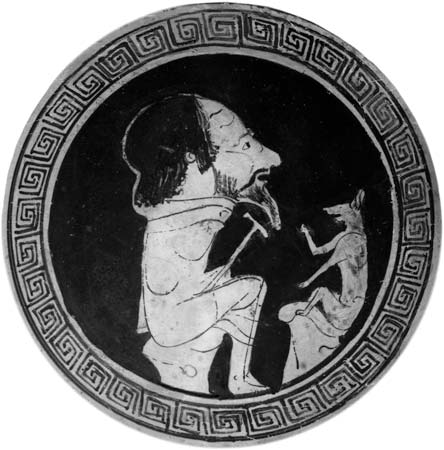
Aesop and the fox, a recurrent character in Aesop's fables; red-figure pottery from c. 450 BC

Ancient Greek folklore includes genres such as mythology (Greek mythology), legend, and folktales. According to classicist William Hansen: "the Greeks and Romans had all the genres of oral narrative known to us, even ghost stories and urban legends, but they also told all kinds that in most of the Western world no longer circulate orally, such as myths and fairytales."

Specific genres of folklore have been the topic of scholarly examination, including ghostlore. For example, classicist Debbie Felton notes that "the Greeks and Romans had many folk-beliefs concerning ghosts", and highlights a variety of instances of the genre in the Classical record.

Historically, classicists rarely delved into folklore studies.

== Music ==
Ancient Greek folk music encompassed a variety of genres and themes, and was used daily for both religious and entertainment purposes. Music was regarded as necessary for living a good, peaceful life, and thus incorporated it into their lives via work songs, drinking songs, hymns, lullabies, and children's ditties. Some instruments that were popular for music composition included two string type instruments–the lyre and kithara–and the aulos, a double-reed instrument.

== Rituals ==
Rituals in Ancient Greece were centered around communicating and connecting with the gods, meant to honor or please them. Some examples of rituals include sacrifices, festivals, and processions. Due to the nature of these rituals, many of them were associated with cults.

Sacrificial rituals were common throughout Ancient Greece. These would often consist of a community choosing something/one “valuable”–a beautiful maiden, a well-bred animal–and sacrificing them to the gods. There have even been cases of having a lowly, impoverished individual be treated like someone of great importance for a year before being clothed in fine garments and chased out of the city as a scapegoat sacrifice, as was the tradition in the city-state of Massilia.

== See also ==
- Modern Greek folklore
- Roman folklore
