= Parkapzuk =

The parkapzuk (Armenian: պարկապզուկ) is a droneless, horn-belled bagpipe played in Armenia. The double-chanters each have five or six finger-holes, but the chanters are tuned slightly apart, giving a "beat" as the soundwaves of each interfere, resulting in a penetrating tone. Researchers in 1996 and 1997 noted they recorded one of the last active pipers of that time.

The Parkapzuk is made of sheep or lamb skin, which has been gutted and hardened. The size of the 'bag', depends on the player's comfortable size. The pipes are made of wood. Wood was the original material, preferably wood from an apricot tree, but today some of the pipes have been made of plastic, as it is cheaper and less difficult to make.

Some sources indicate that the parkapzuk is single chantered, while others indicate it is double-chantered like the tulum.

== Musical groups ==
- Arev Armenian Folk Ensemble
- Shoghaken Ensemble
- Hayren
- Tkzar Ensemble

== Resources ==
- The Gajdy Weblog of Ernesto Fisher
- Parkapzuk photo
