= Floghera =

Type of flute

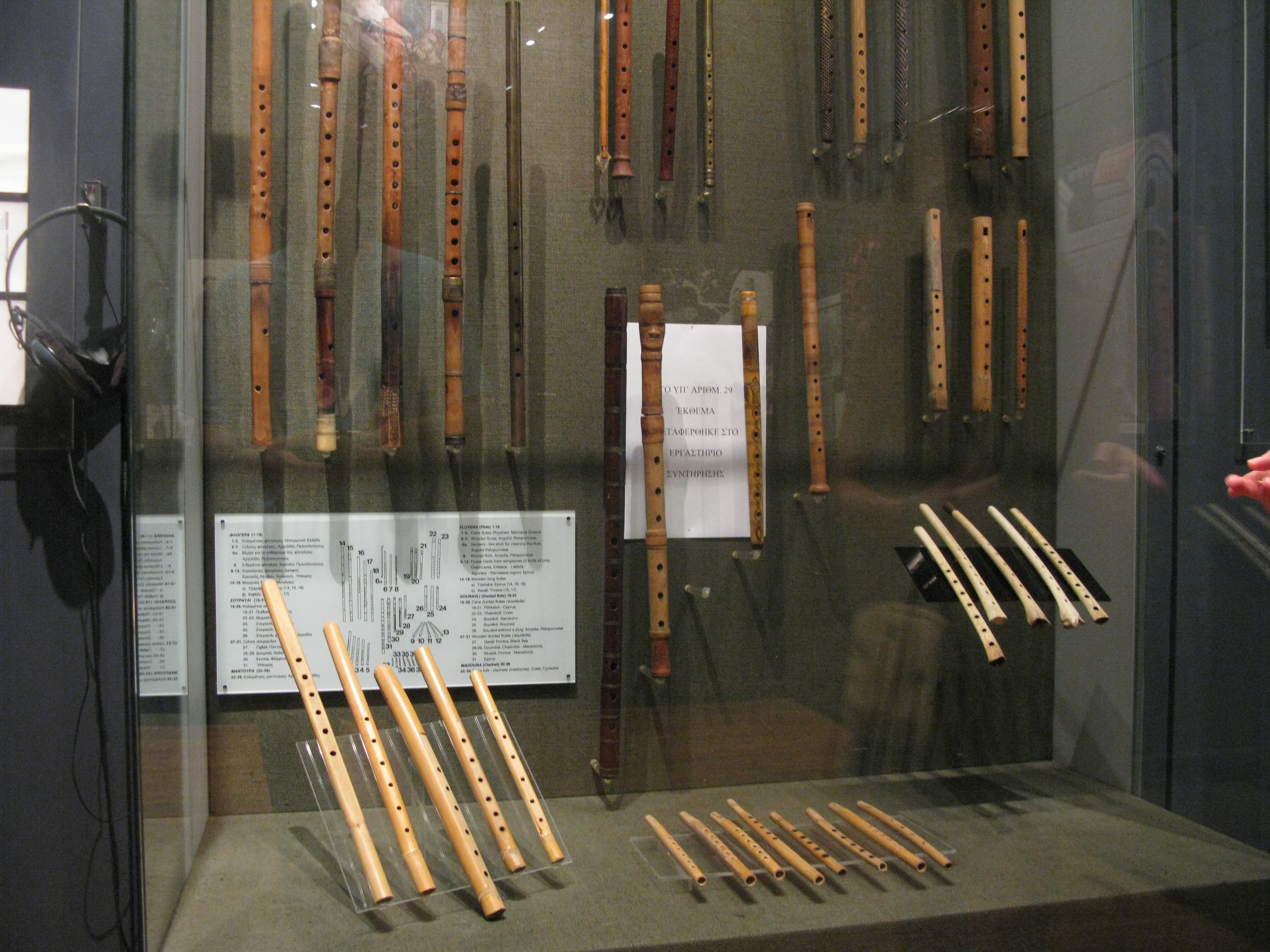
Greek flutes

The floghera (Greek: φλογέρα, romanized: floyéra, pronounced [floˈʝeɾa]) is a type of flute used in Greek folk music. It is a simple end-blown bamboo flute without a fipple, which is played by directing a narrow air stream against its sharp, open upper end. It typically has seven finger holes.

== See also ==
- Greek musical instruments
- Greek music
- Greek folk music
