= Koza (bagpipe) =

Musical instrument

Woodwind instrument
- Classification: bagpipe

Related instruments
- Various bagpipes

A Koza (meaning "goat") is the generic term for one of five basic types of bagpipes used in Polish folk music. The koza comes from the southern mountainous region of Poland known as Podhale and differs considerably from other types of bagpipes in its construction. Its scale is: b,c,d,e,f,g (with drones on B, f and b). The instrument is known for producing a continuous, low pitch.

== Construction and appearance ==
Unlike other bagpipes, the koza has three drones: one in the separate drone-pipe, and two in the chanter, which has three channels. This wind instrument consists of a single reed pipe, often made of a cane blade lapped onto copper tubing, set into motion when wind is fed by arm pressure on a goat-skin bag. The pipe is held in a wooden socket tied into the bag, which is inflated by the mouth (through a blowpipe with a leather nonreturn valve). The finger holes of the pipe, or chanter, play melodies while the remaining pipes, or drones, sound single notes tuned against the chanter by means of extendable joints.

== See also ==
- Music of Poland
