= Askomandoura =

Greek backpipe

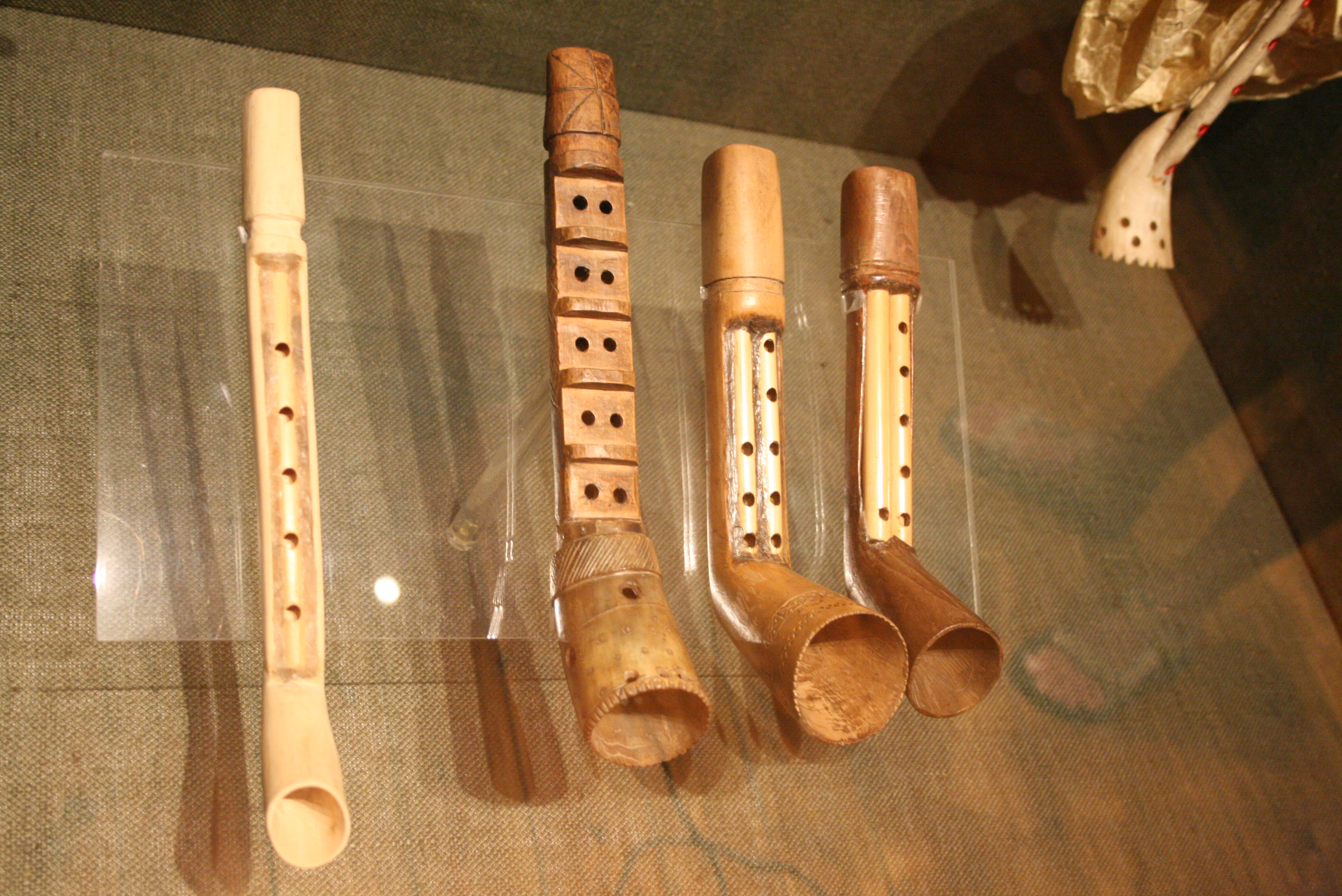
Chanters from a bagpipe, called askomandoura. Part of the name, mandoura, is also used for a simple mouth-blown reedpipe.

Askomandoura (Greek: ασκομαντούρα) is a type of bagpipe played as a traditional instrument on the Greek island of Crete, similar to the tsampouna.

Its use in Crete is attested in illustrations from the mid-15th Century.

With respect to the way of the production sound, it is categorized as an aerophone musical instrument.

== See also ==
- Mandoura
- Greek musical instruments
- Cretan music
- Cretan lyra
- Greek music
