= Cymbalum =

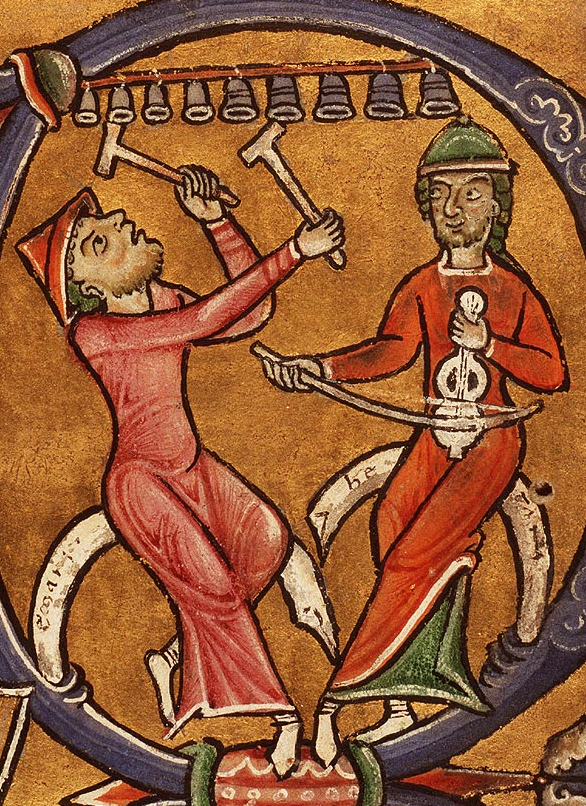
Aeman hammers a cymbala (set of bells) while Ethan bows a fiddle. Bout Psalter Book of Hours.

See also Carillon and Bell chime

The cymbalum (plural cymbala) was the name of two historical instruments, medieval European bells hung and struck with a hammer and Greek kymbalon cymbals. The two instruments may possibly be related, based on the same name being used for both and for the similar "cup-like shape." This relationship in not unique to European bells and cymbals; Persian bells (zang) and cymbals (sanj) share a similar word spread.

The singular cymbalum is a single chime bell, while cymbalum refers to a group of bells (a bell chime).

Chimes, which today are bells and bell sounds (such as clock chimes) derives from cymbala. The term is used for "stationary bells...less extensive than a carillon", such as tubular bells in an orchestra. Chimes is used for groups of bells hung in a "set location", with a "limited range" of tones that are struck. They may be large or small. In simple applications such as on a clock, chimes may be diatonic (two notes, set of two bells).

The word cymbalum would be transferred to the harpsichord as the clavicembalo (Italian) or cembalo (German). It also became an organ stop.

== Medieval bell chimes ==
Illustrations from about the 10th to 15th century show performers playing sets of bells (cymbala) hung from a frame or overhead and played with a hammer. Images "usually show from four and eight bells", but also as many as 15. They were tuned diatonically to a C-based scale (to include B flat).

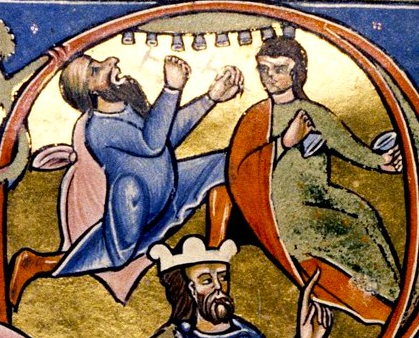
12th-13th century, England. Musicians play the cymbala (set of small chime-bells) and cymbala cup-shaped cymbals, Bodleian Library MS. Laud Misc. 752

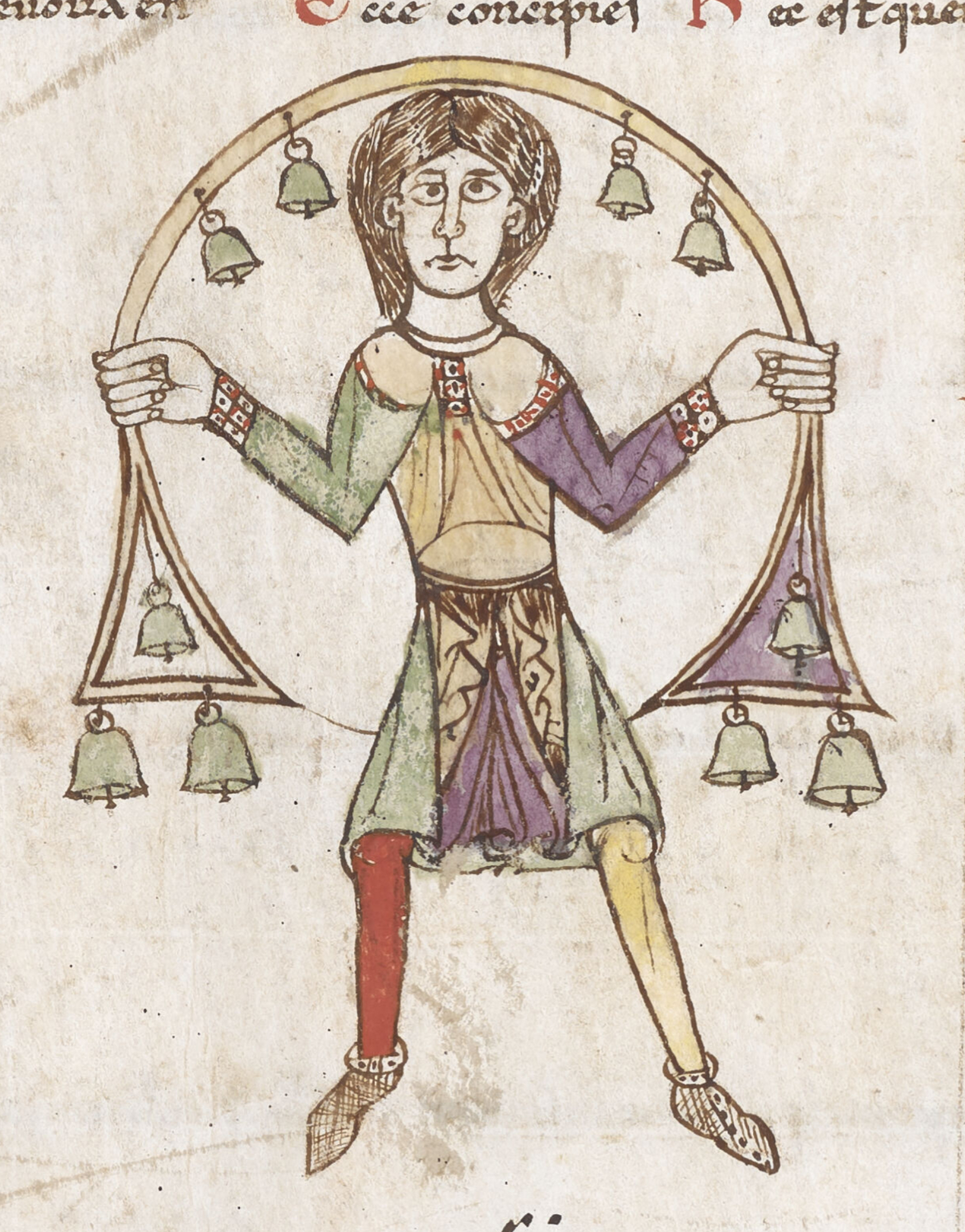
11th century, southern France. Chime bells wrung by clappers. Harley MS 4951, folio 299v.

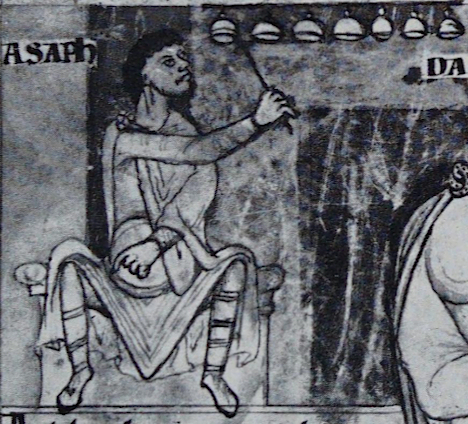
1050-1100, Germany. English: Asaph playing chime bells, Pommersfeld Bible, Gräflich Schönbornsche Bibliothek, 334, fol. II 148

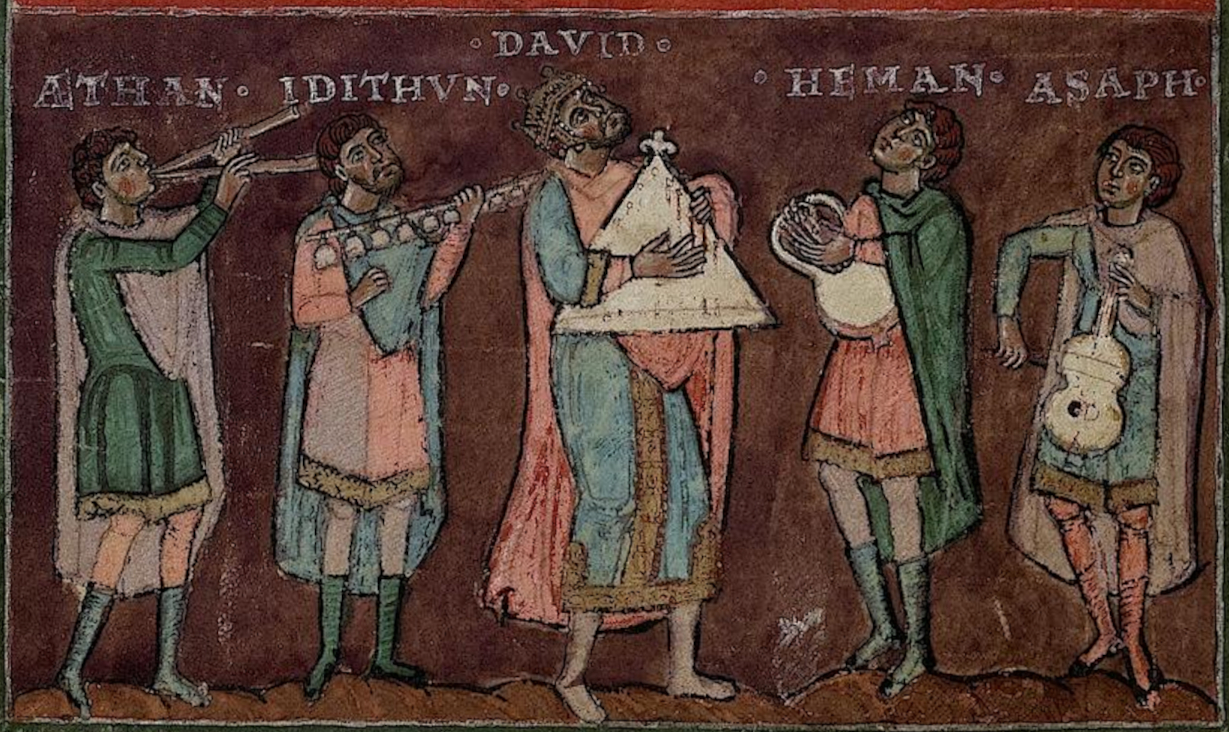
1050 A.D., Germany. King David playing psaltery with Aethan (with pipes), Idithun (with bell chimes), Heman (with lyre) and Asaph (with vielle/viol). Heidelberg Psalter, Roma, Bibl. Apostolica Vaticana, Pal. lat. 39, f. 44v

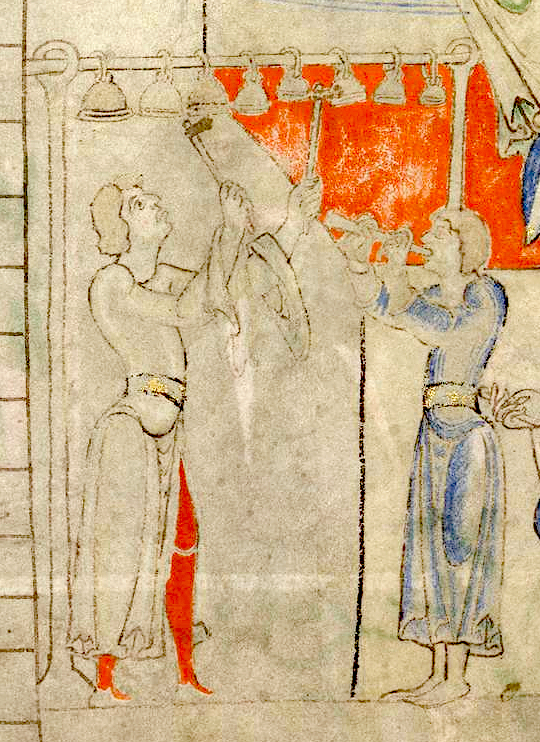
Early 12th century A.D., France. Cymbala players, from Le Roi David musicien, miniature pleine page Bible d'Étienne Harding, Ms.14, f.13v

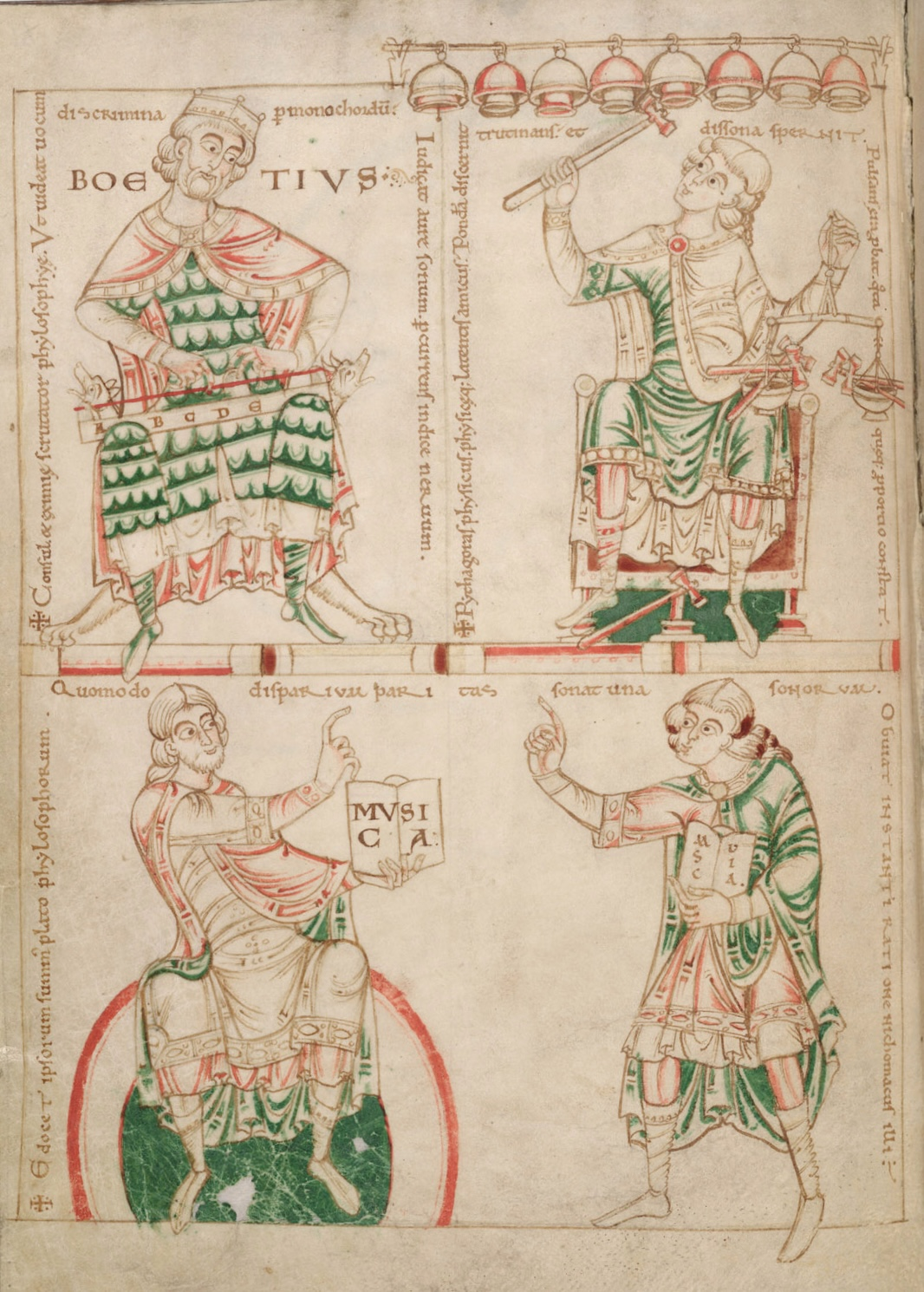
Circa 1130 A.D. Top left, Boethius with monochord. Top right, Pythagoras with cymbala. Bottom left, Plato. Bottom right, Nicomachus. Boethius' Instutione Musica, Cambridge University Library Ii 3.12 fol 61v.

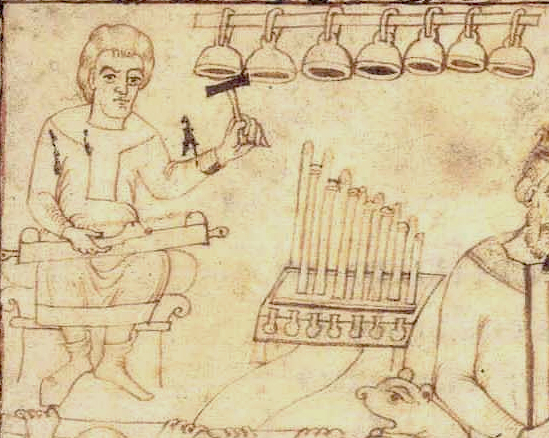
Early 12th century, France/England. Musician playing monochord and cymbala, next to a pipe organ, from B.18, folio 1r, PSALTERIUM TRIPLEX, St John's College Cambridge.

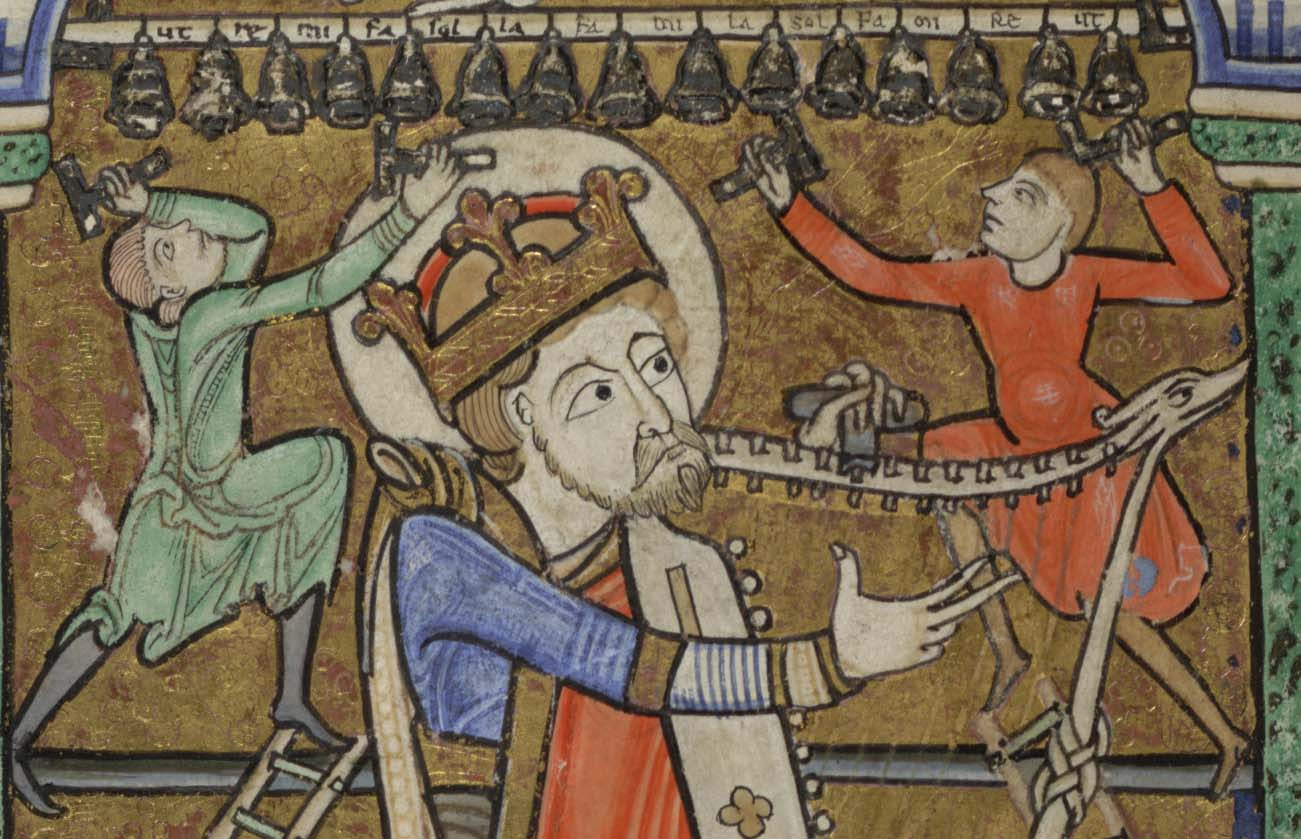
1170 A.D., Scotland. Kind David tuning harp while musicians play bells, detail from Hunterian Psalter Glasgow University Library MS Hunter 229 (U.3.2), folio 21V.

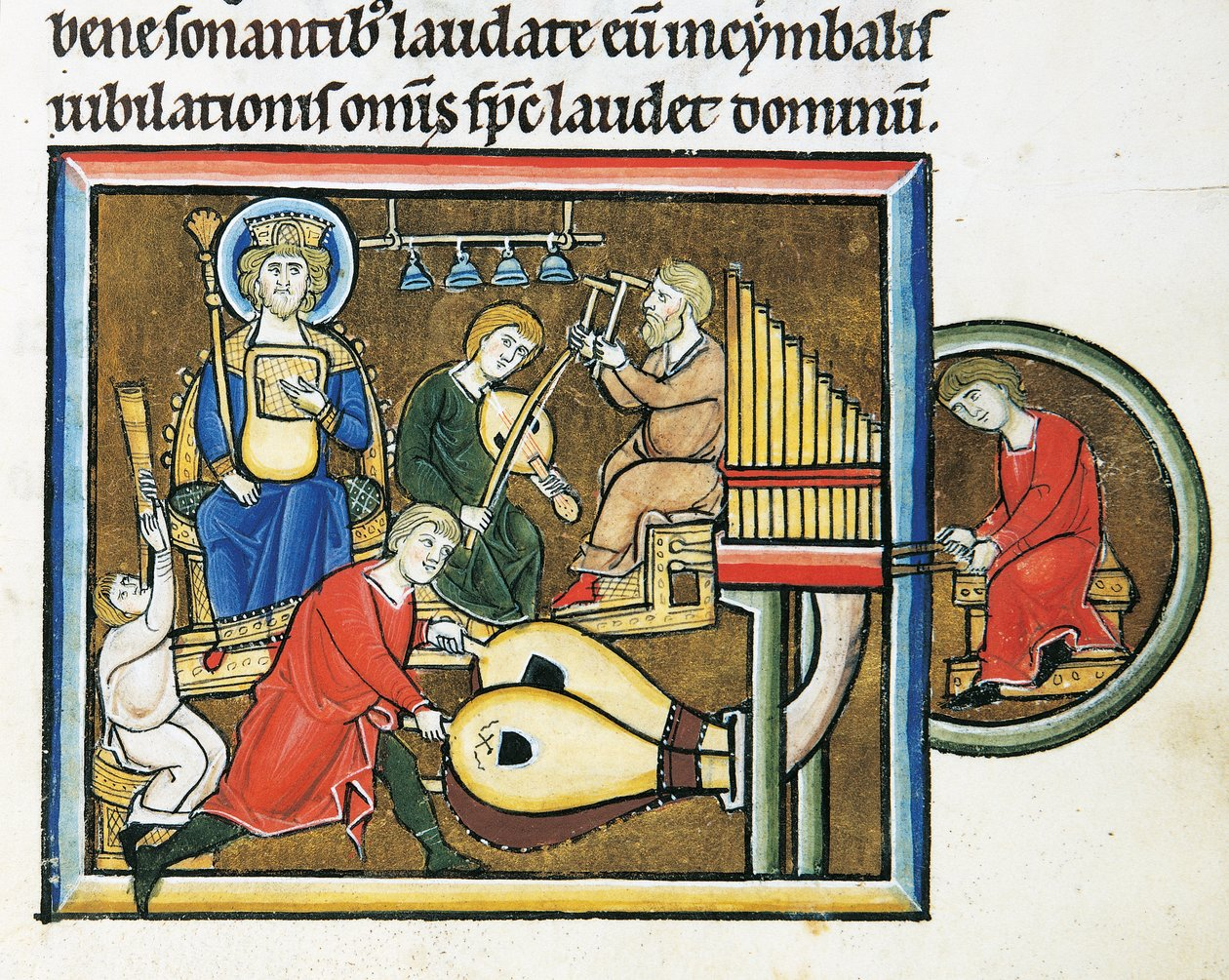
circa 1201-1208 A.D. King David holding the rotte lyre and musicians playing chime bells, vielle, pipe organ and long horn. St. Elizabeth’s Psalter, MS CXXXVII folio 149r.

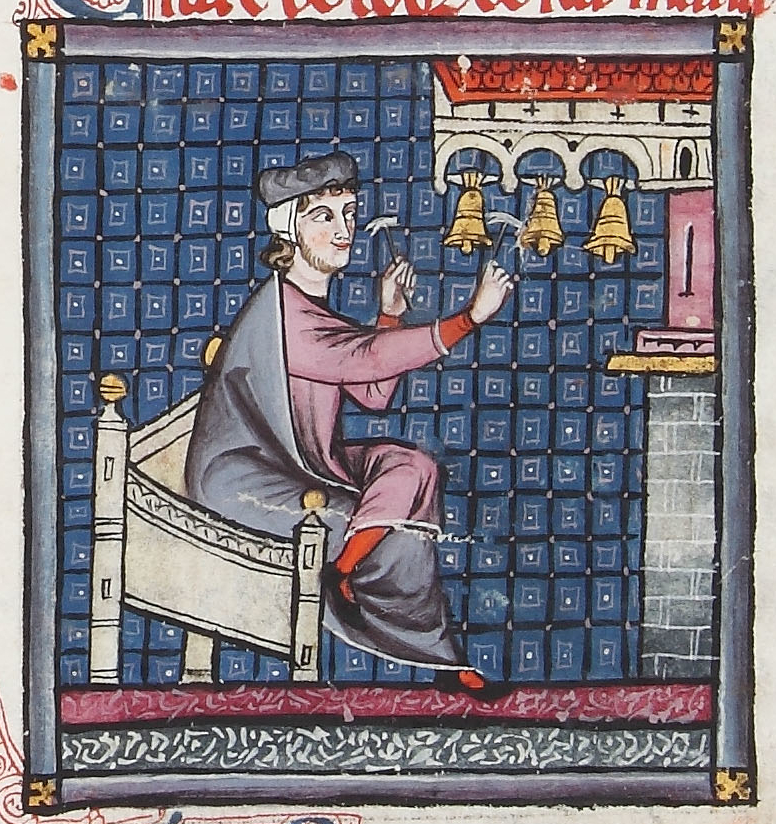
Circa 1280 A.D., Spain. Bells hung on indoor frame, designed to look like the arched roof of a Romanesque cathedral such as Westminster Abbey.

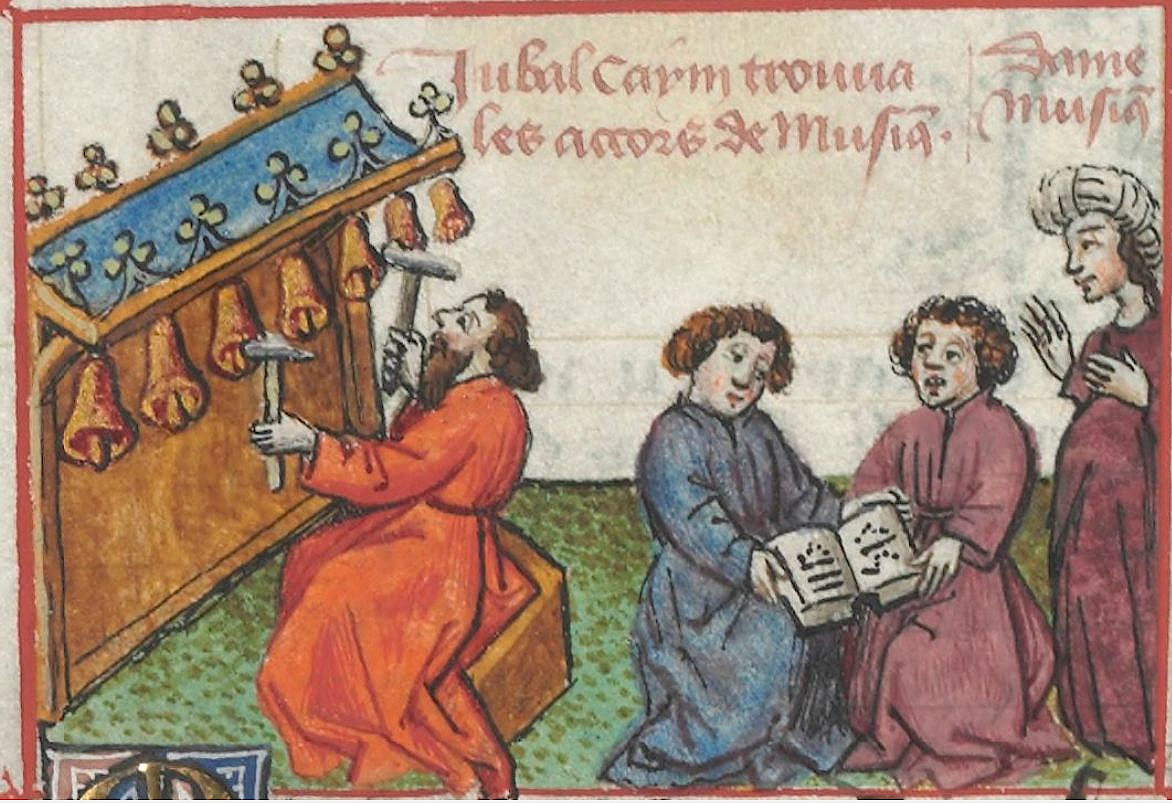
Circa 1440 A.D., France. Jubal with chime bells (cymbala), from Champion of the dames. Same style bell wrack as in Cantigas de Santa Maria image.

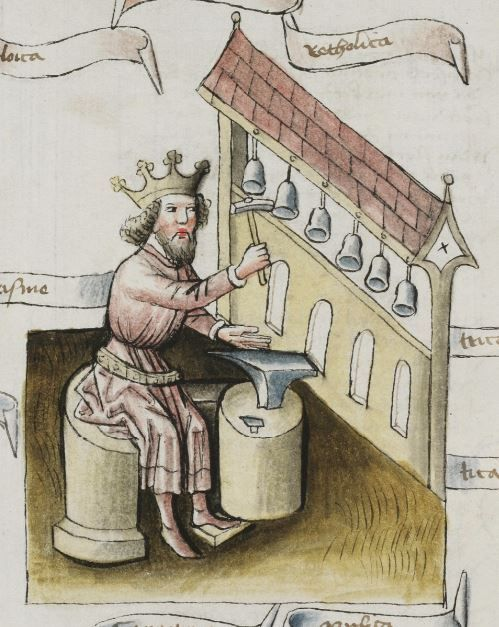
1461, Germany. Bell chimes hung from rack that resembles a church.

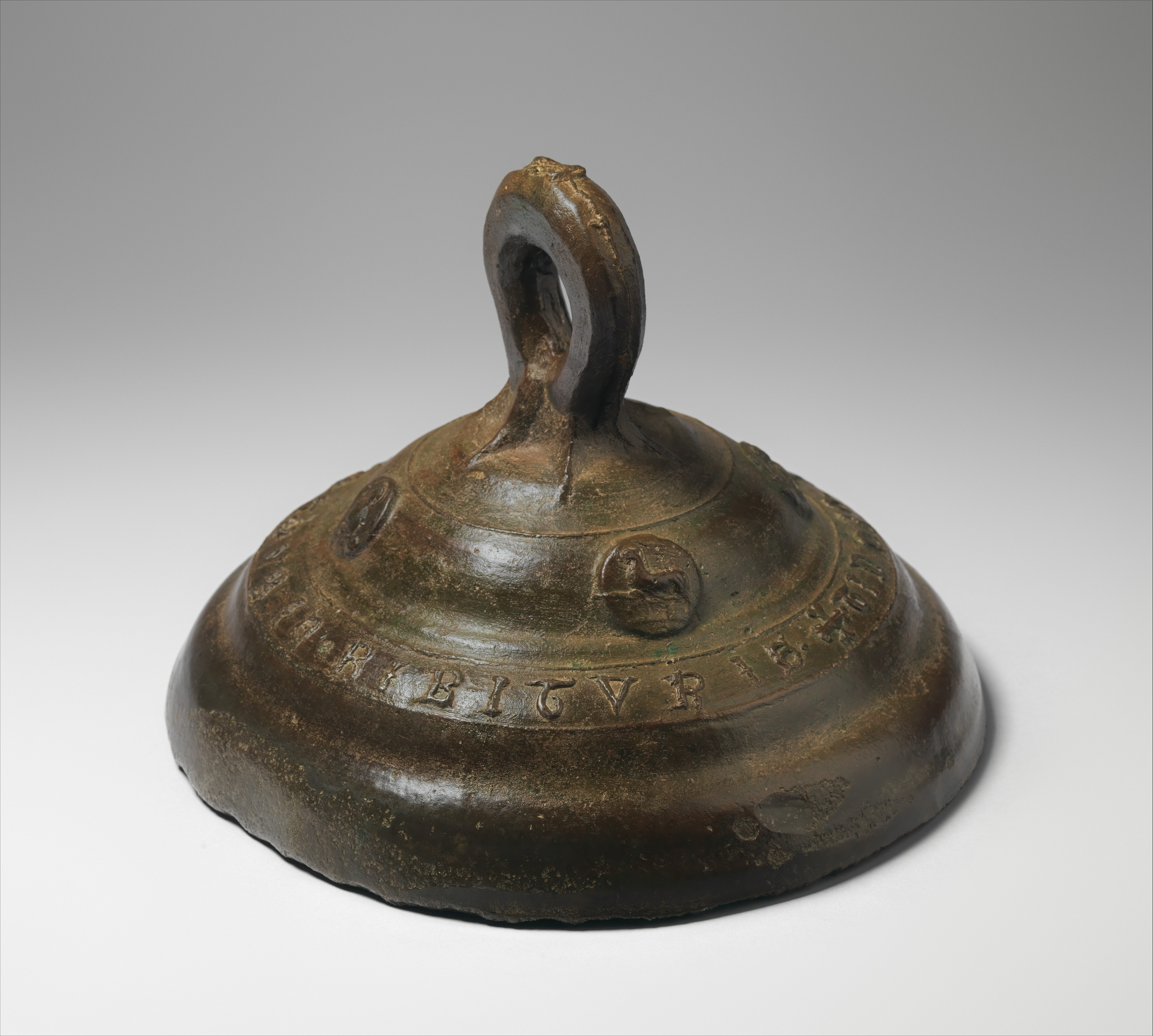
13th century, Germany. Refectory bell. A single bell was a cymbalum.

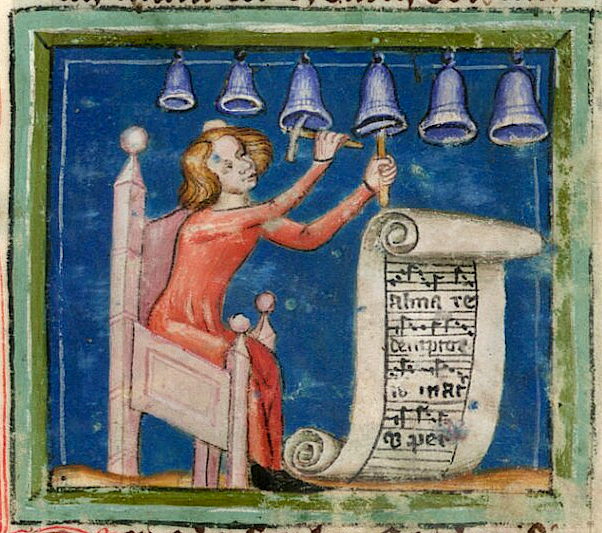
Germany circa 1370 A.D. Chime bells, from Chronik um 1370 Cgm 5 Folio 18r

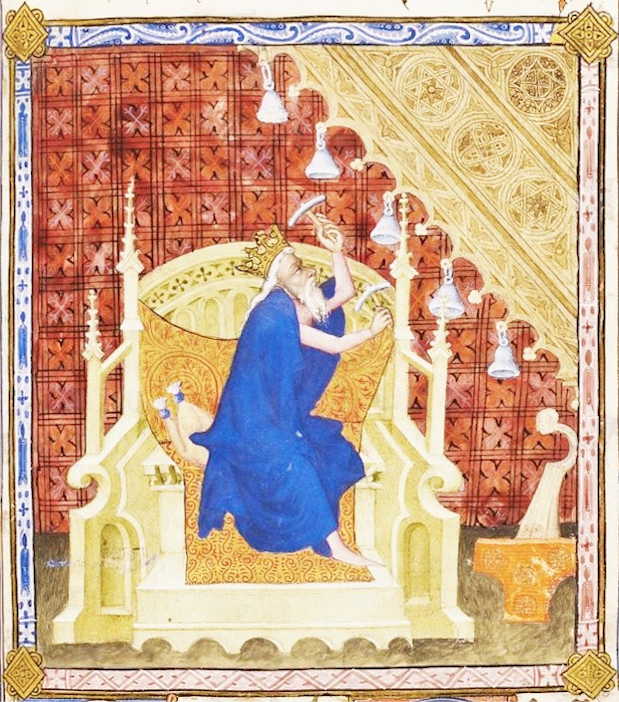
Circa 1386, France. David playing chime bells.

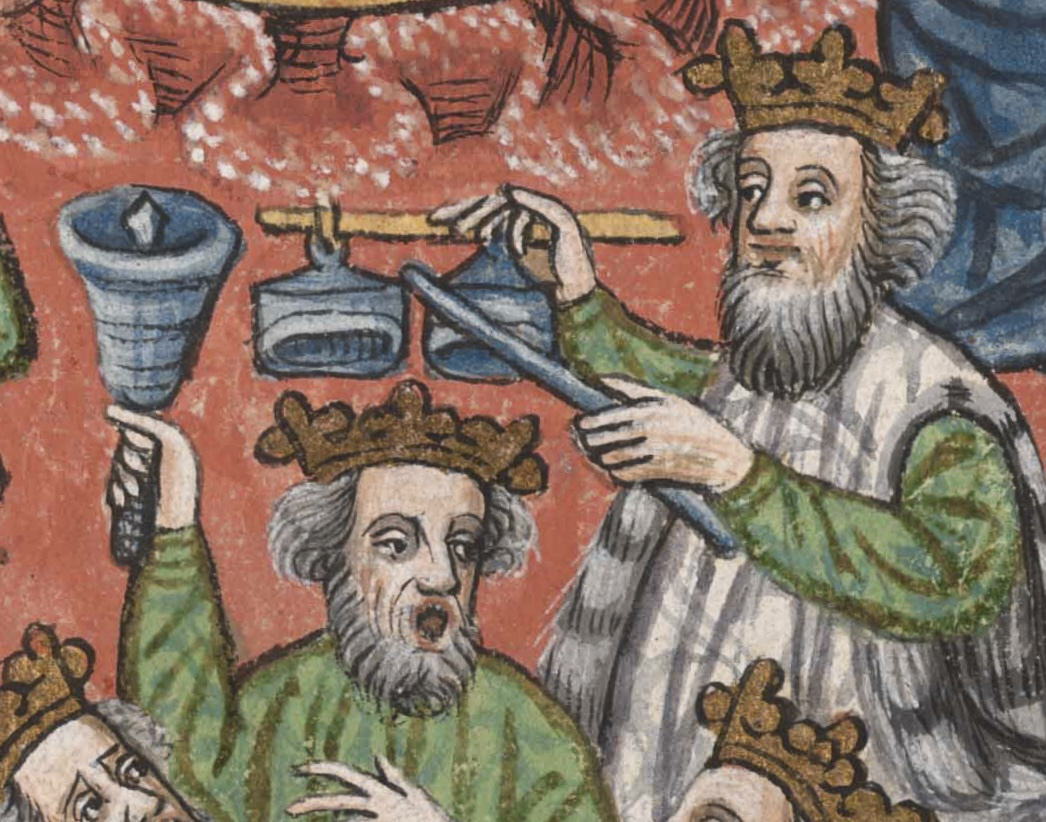
1448, Germany. Elders of the Apocalypse play chimes (hung from a rod) and a handbell.

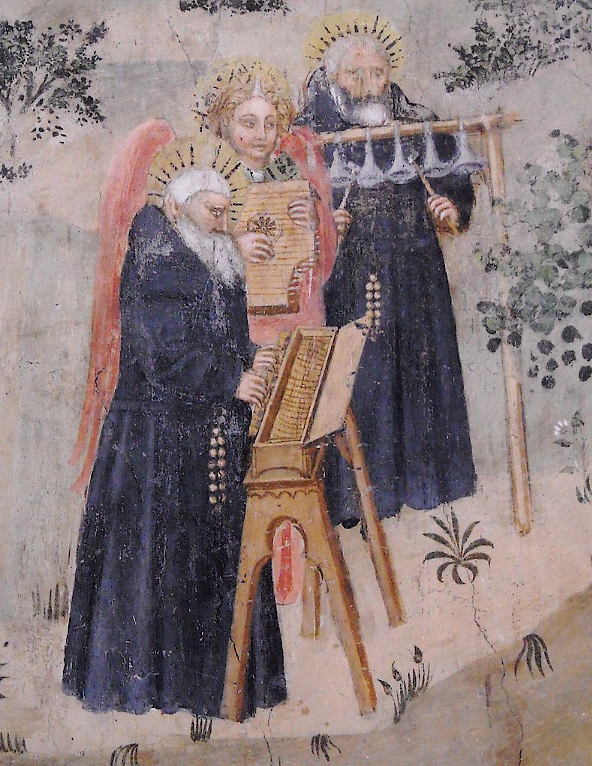
After 1438, Italy. Clavichord, chime bells and psaltery.

== Greek cymbals ==
See Krotala

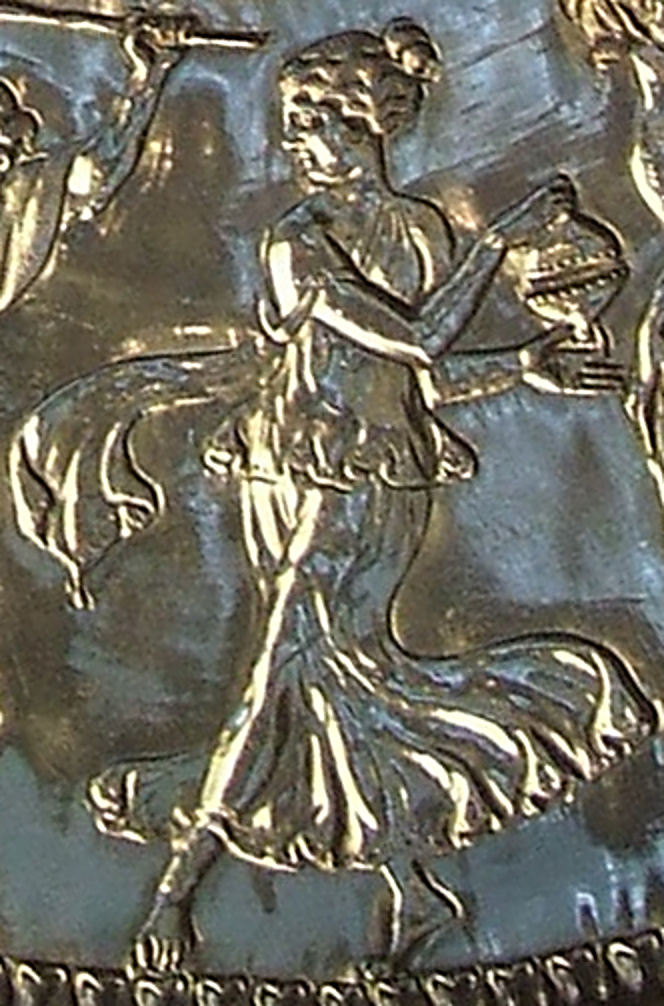
4th century A.D., England. Buried Roman treasure recovered at Mildenhall. Maenad with a pair of kymbalon.

Kymbolon (Greek) or cymbala (Latin) were cup shaped cymbals used in Greek and Roman culture to accompany religious "orgiastic" dance. They were played to induce ecstasy and related to the Cybele cult from Asia Minor. As Romans conquered in the east, they brought back musicians, and women could be seen dancing exotically in the streets and in taverns, accompanied by "crotala, cymbala, tympana, and foreign wind instruments."

The Greeks used words ( οξύβαφοι, oxyvaphi) for vinegar lids or vinegar containers struck with a stick to connotate a musical instrument. The Romans did the same (acetabula ). Further, the words were used for bells or cymbals that had that bowl shape, worn and played by dancers (cymbals in the form of acetabula that are struck together while dancing: cymbala acitabula).

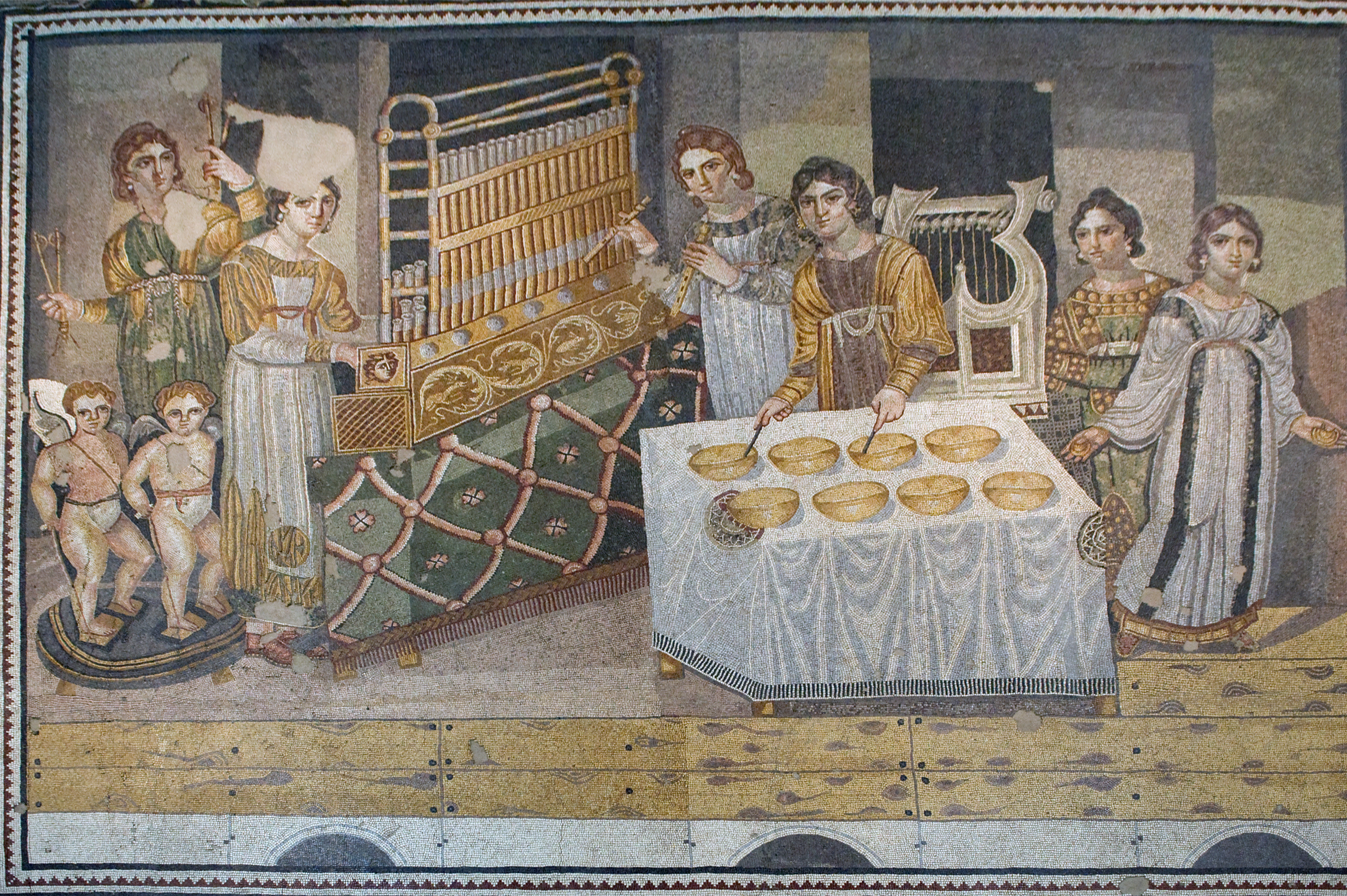
Mosaic of Musicians from Mariamin, last quarter of 4th century AD. Six women perform on instruments, two infants, dressed as Eros, work the bellows for an organ. Apart from the organ there is a pair of krotala (cymbals on sticks), double-flute (diaulos or tibia), kithara, cymbala (finger cymbals) and oxyvaphi (six metal bowls on a table).

In a 4th century mosaic from Mariamin (Byzantine Empire, specifically in Syria), multiple cymbals or bell-shaped and bell sounding instruments may be seen, which illustrate possibilities for origins. Included in the mosaic are crotala (bells or cymbals on forked sticks), struck to make them chime. Hand held or finger cymbals are seen in the mosaic as well; and on the table is an instrument that links metal food containers (and their bowl shape) to music.

Roman cymbala had concave centers and turned (flattened) rims. Although cup shaped, more rarely, the kymbolon might be flat, like a platter.

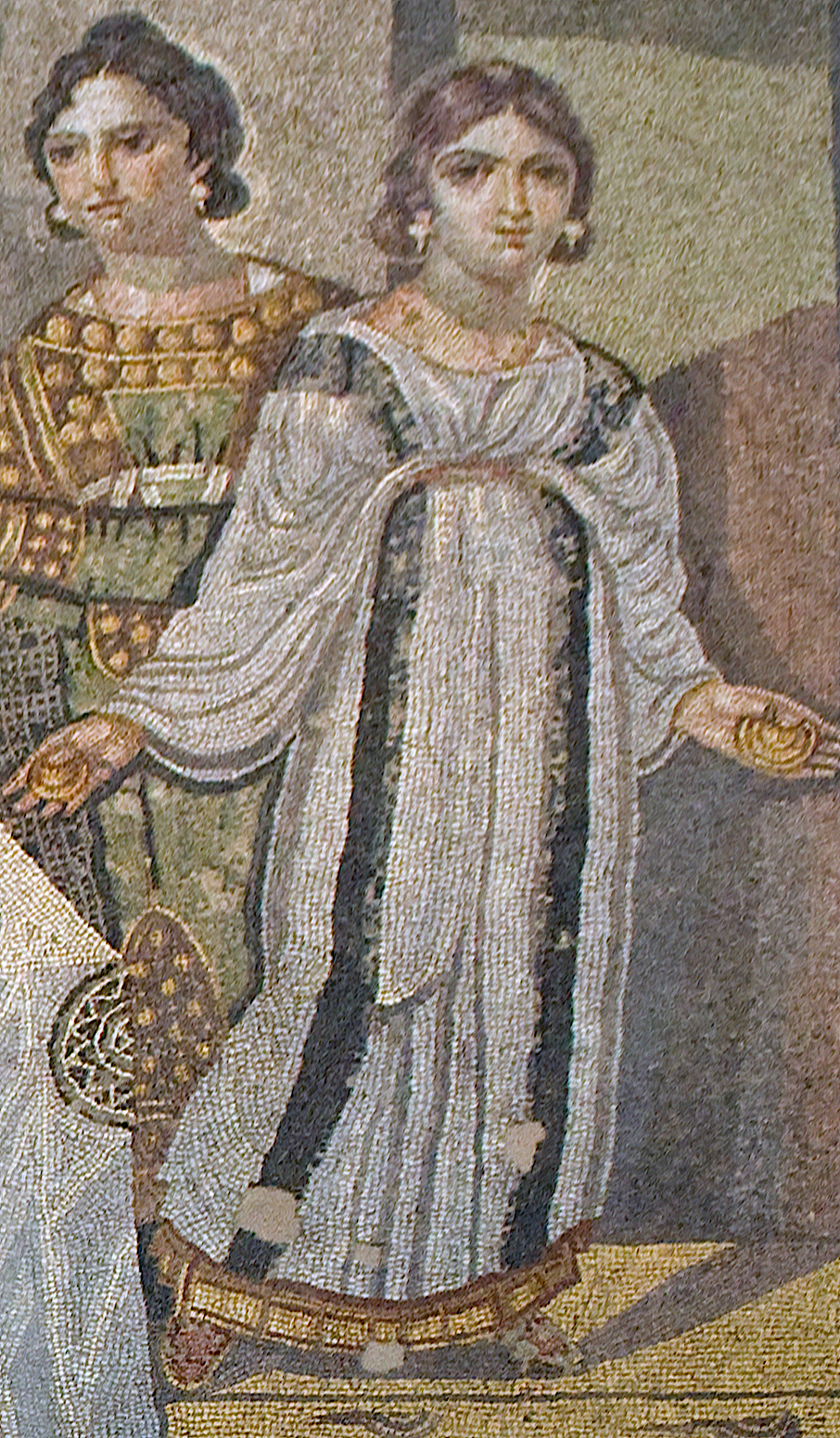
4th century A.D., Byzantine Empire. Woman playing cymbala (or kymbala), from the Mosaic of the Female Musicians, Mariamin

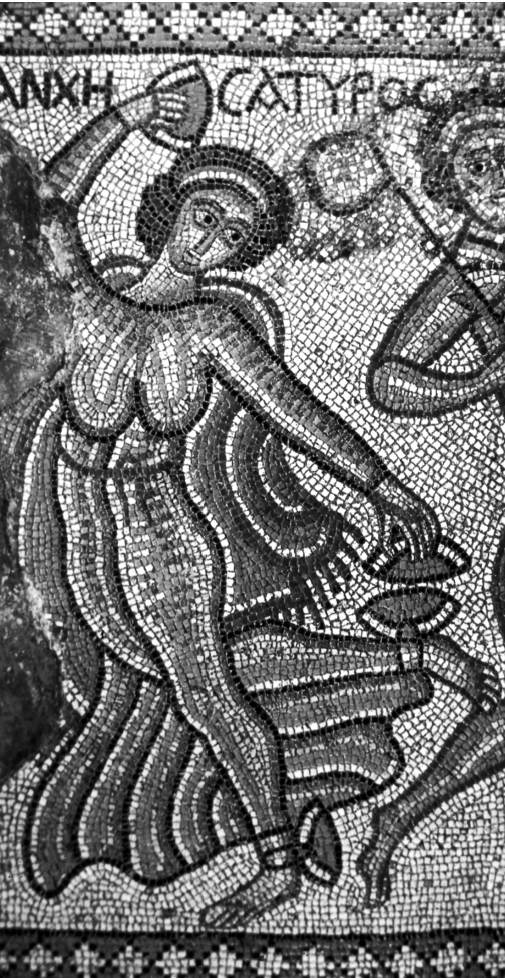
6th century A.D., Byzantine Empire, House of Madaba (now in Jordan). Dancer wearing cymbala acitabula (cymbala that have the same shape as acitabula vinegar bowls or lids).

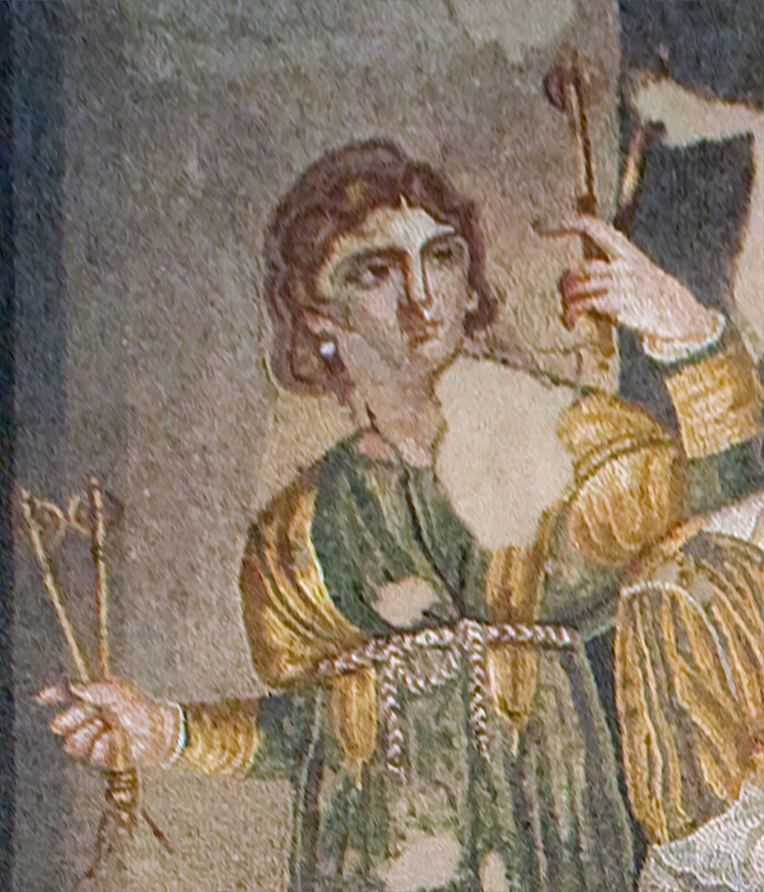
4th century A.D., Byzantine Empire. Krotala player, from the Mosaic of the Female Musicians, Mariamin. The crotala and cymbala were played by musicians in the same group.

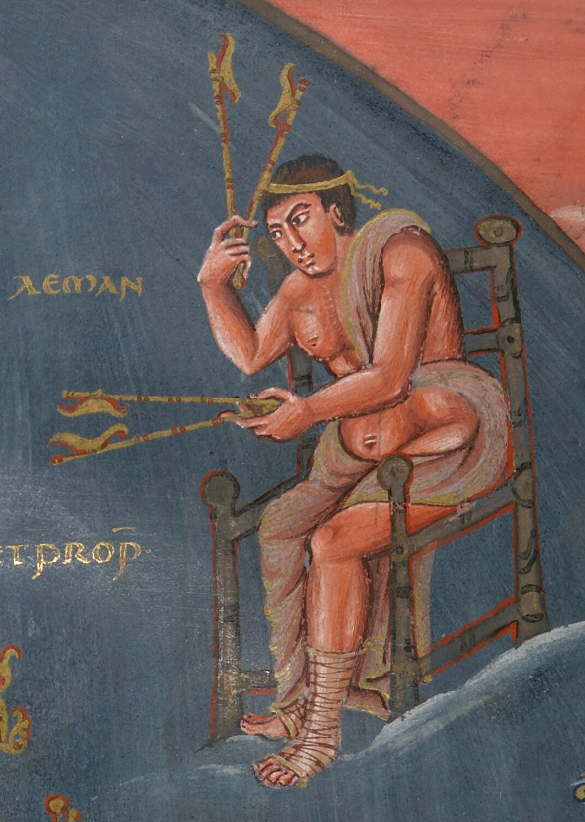
9th century A.D., Carolingian Empire. Aeman playing crotals, showing a blending of ancient traditions in the medieval period; in the Carolingian Renaissance, the Roman cymbala cymbals were attached to "forked sticks" to make the crotals.

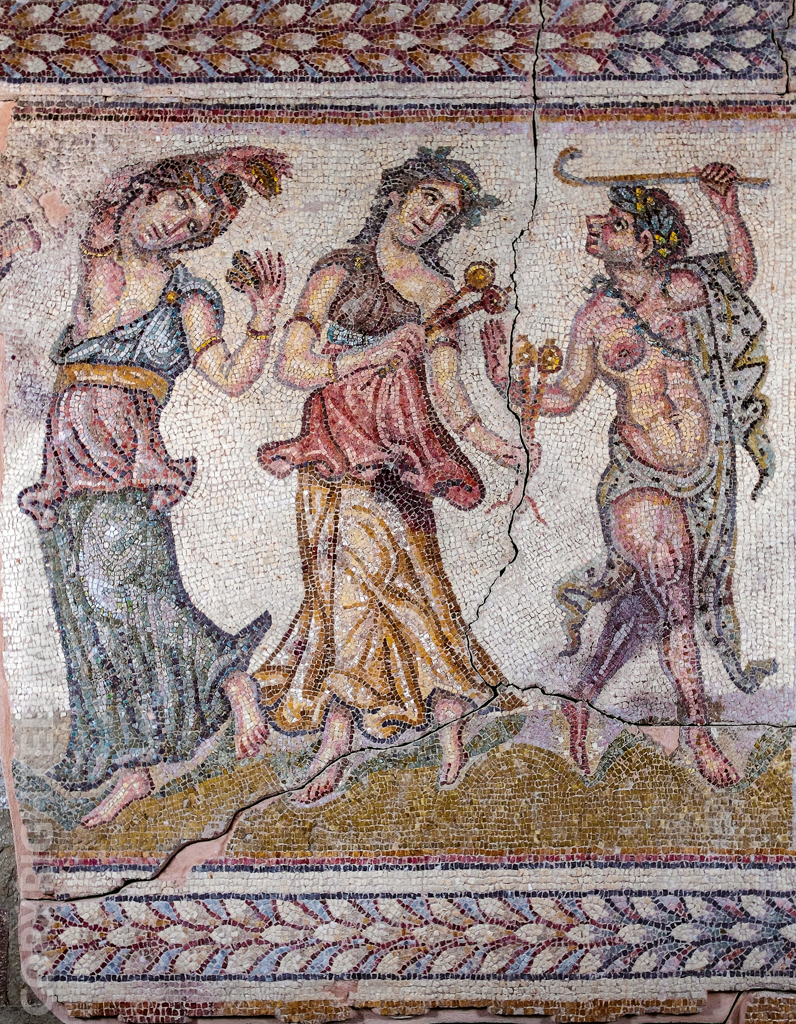
4th century A.D. Mosaic from the city of Augusta Traiana showing maenads dancing with Dionysus, playing Krotalum and cymbalum (as finger cymbals) .

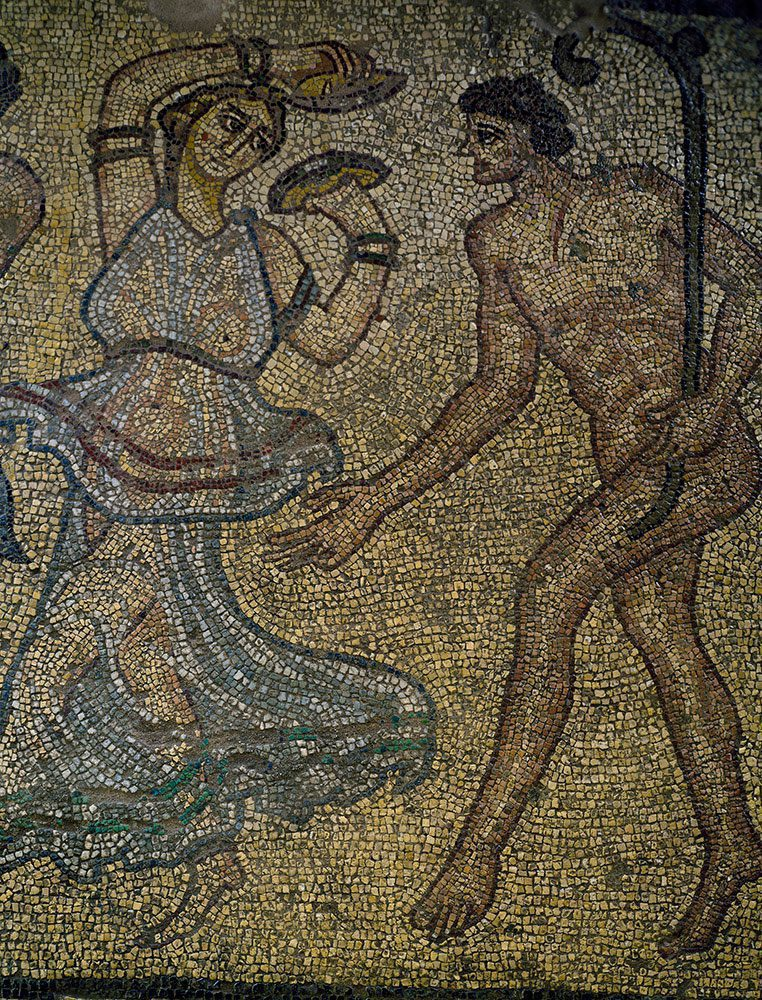
5th century A.D., Roman villa at Agora, Argos, Greece. A dancer in the thiasus plays cymbala and dances with Dionysus.

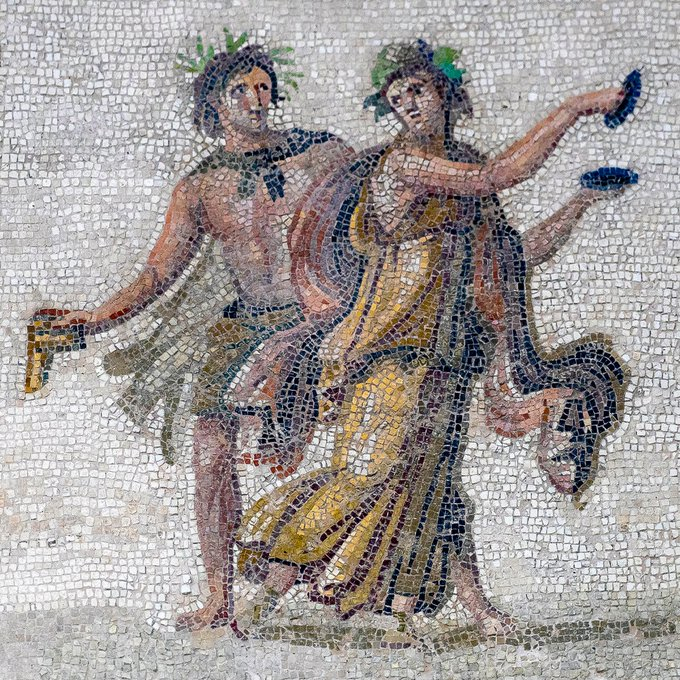
2nd-3rd century A.D., Seleucia Pieria. Maenad playing cymbala dances with satyr carrying syrinx (panpipes named for an Arcadian nymph pursued by Pan). Now at Hatay Archaeology Museum, Antakya, Turkey.

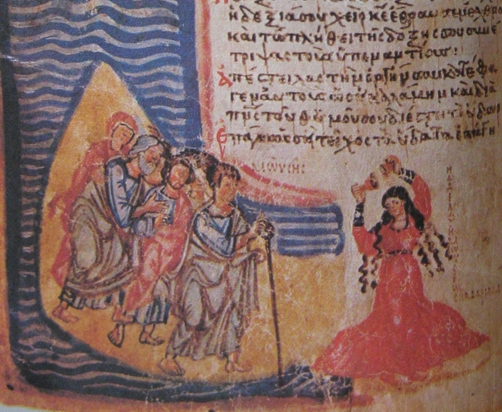
Circa mid-ninth century A.D., Chludov Psalter. Byzantine art. Moses leads his people across the red sea while Miriam dances with cup-shaped cymbals.

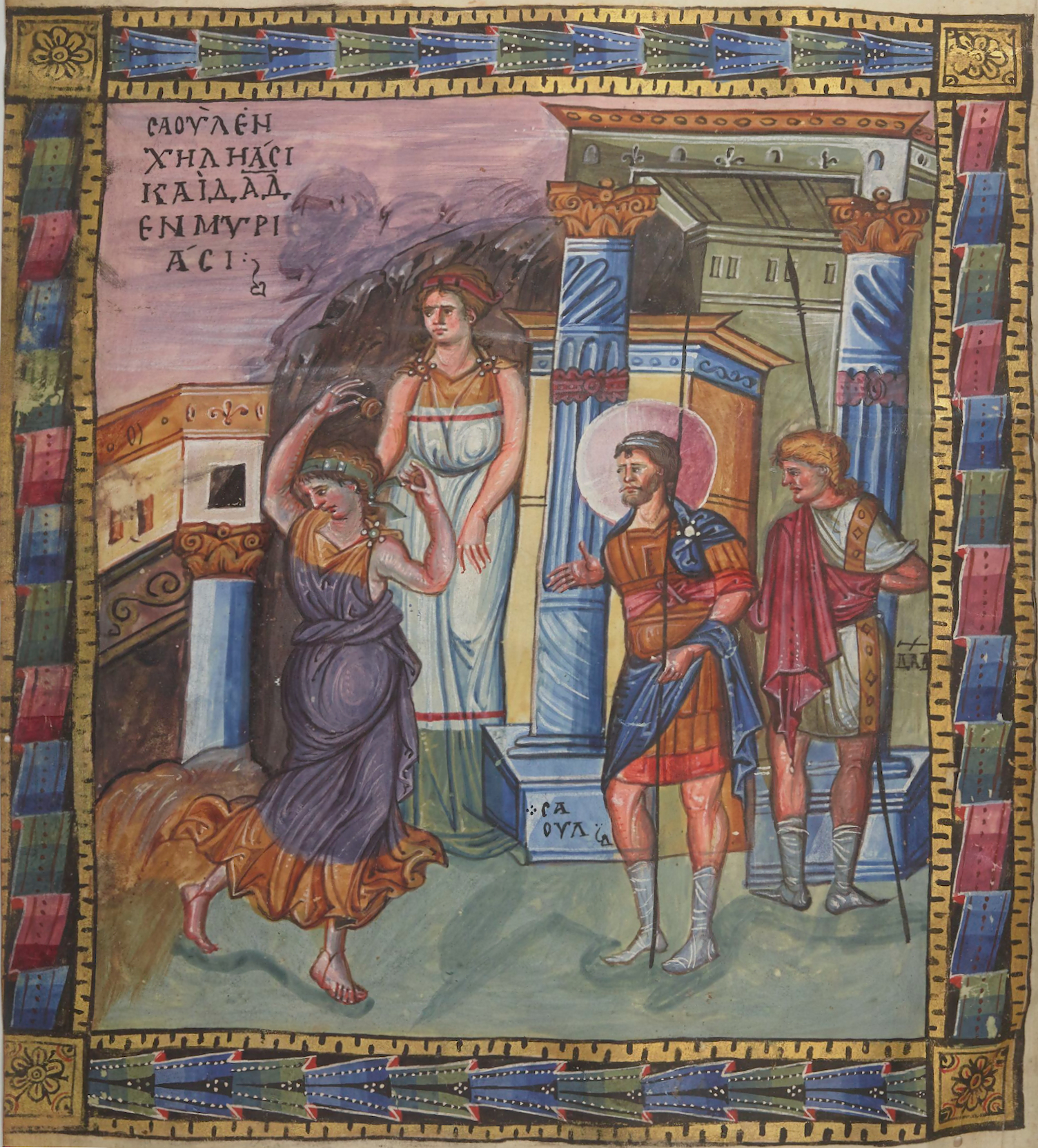
950-960 A.D., Byzantine Empire. Image from the Paris Psalter. A young woman dances with hand cymbals for David and Saul, another woman looking on.

14th century A.D., Bulgaria. Exodus 15:20 "Then Miriam the prophetess, Aaron's sister, took a tambourine in her hand, and all the women followed her, with tambourines and dancing." Here the women use cymbals and a drum. Tomić Psalter.
