= Crotalum =

Kind of clapper used in religious dances in classical antiquity

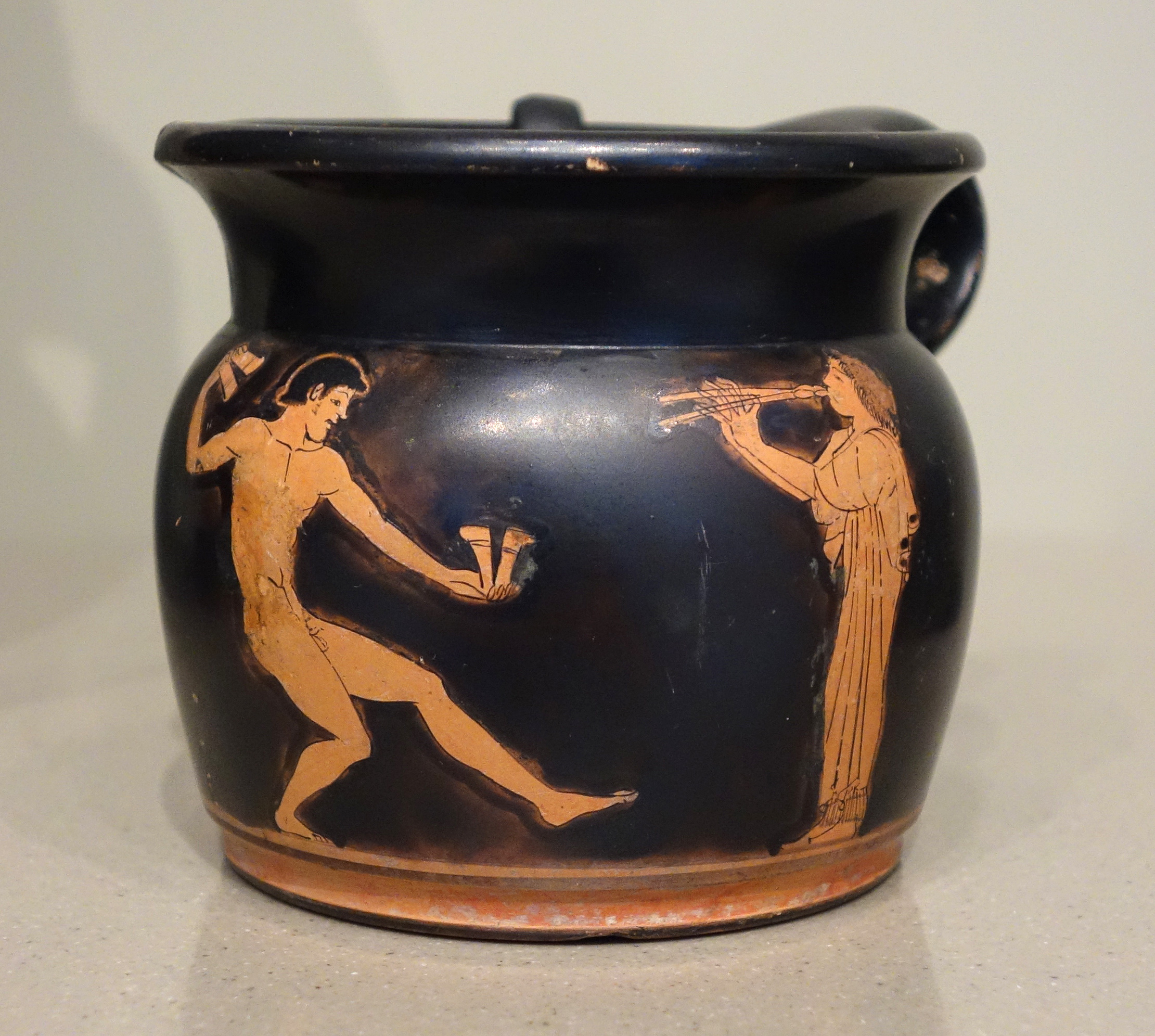
A dancer performs with crotala, accompanied by a flute player. Athenian red-figure mug attributed to the Brygos Painter, c. 480 BC.

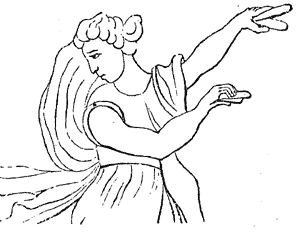
Illustration taken from the drawing of an ancient marble in Spon's Miscellanea, representing one of the crotalistriae performing.

In classical antiquity, a crotalum, (κρόταλον krotalon) plural crotala, was a kind of clapper or castanet used in religious dances by groups in ancient Greece and elsewhere, including the Korybantes.

The term has been erroneously supposed by some writers to be the same as the sistrum. These mistakes are refuted at length by Friedrich Adolph Lampe (1683–1729) in De cymbalis veterum. From the Suda and the Scholiast on Aristophanes (Nubes, 260), it appears to have been a split reed or cane, which clattered when shaken with the hand. According to Eustathius (Il. XI.160), it was made of shell and brass, as well as wood. Clement of Alexandria attributes the instruments invention to the Sicilians, and forbids the use thereof to the Christians, because of the motions and gestures accompanying the practice.

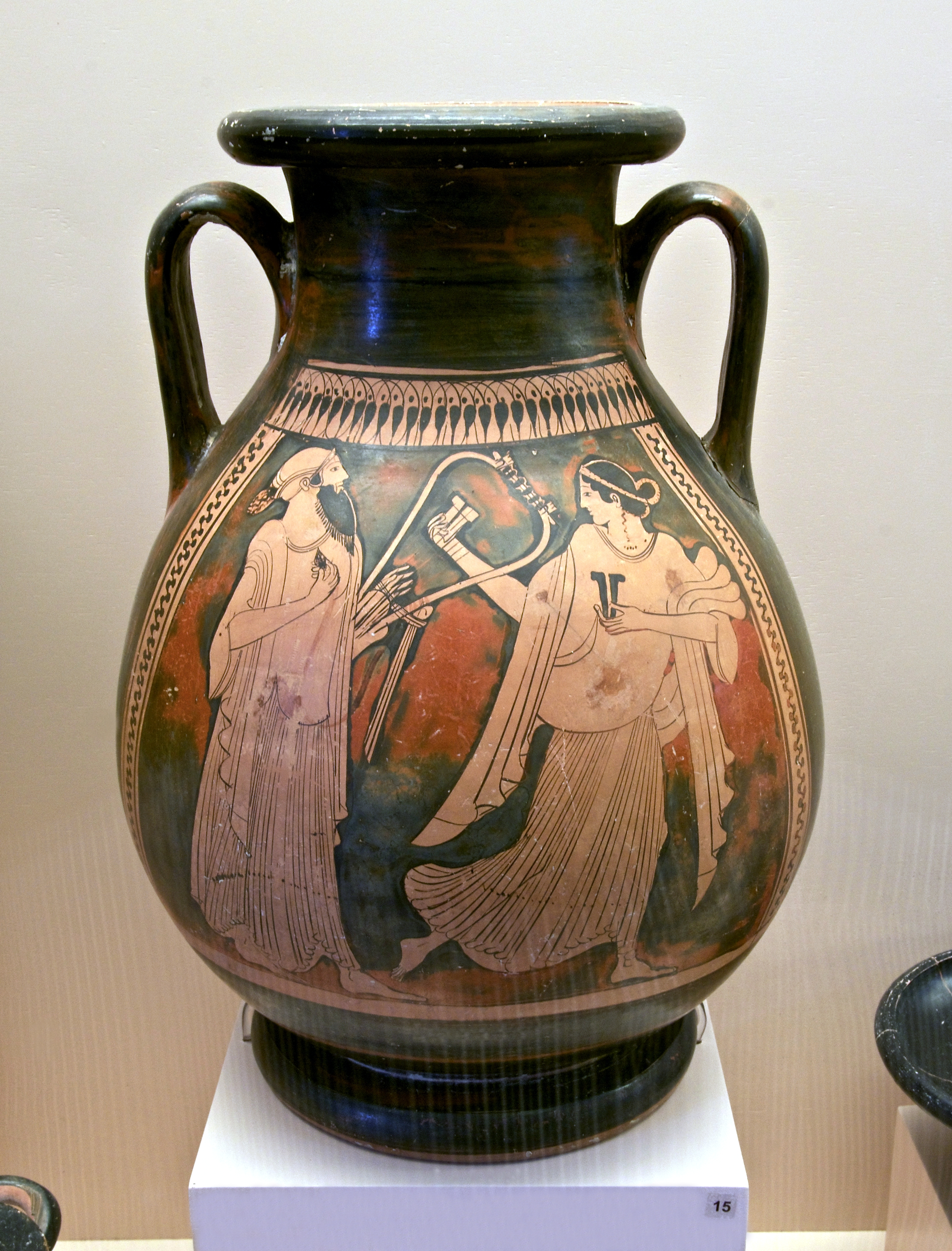
Afterlife scene of a woman playing crotalum clappers leading a man playing a barbitos lyre.

Women who played on the crotalum were termed crotalistriae. Such was Virgil's Copa (2),

Crispum sub crotalo docta movere latus.

This line alludes to the dance with crotala (similar to castanets), for which we have the additional testimony of Macrobius (Saturnalia III.14.4‑8).

As the instrument made a noise somewhat like that of a crane's bill, the bird was called crotalistria, "player on crotala".

Pausanias affirms by way of the epic poet Pisander of Camirus that Heracles did not kill the birds of Lake Stymphalia, but that he drove them away by playing on crotala. Based on this, the instrument must be exceedingly ancient.

The word krotalon is often applied, by an easy metaphor, to a noisy talkative person (Aristoph. Nub. 448; Eurip. Cycl. 104).

== Gallery ==
See: Cymbalum

The instrument continued to be used in a modified form through the early medieval period. The variant illustrated in the Byzantine and Carolingian Empires consisted of a forked stick with cymbals attached to the ends.

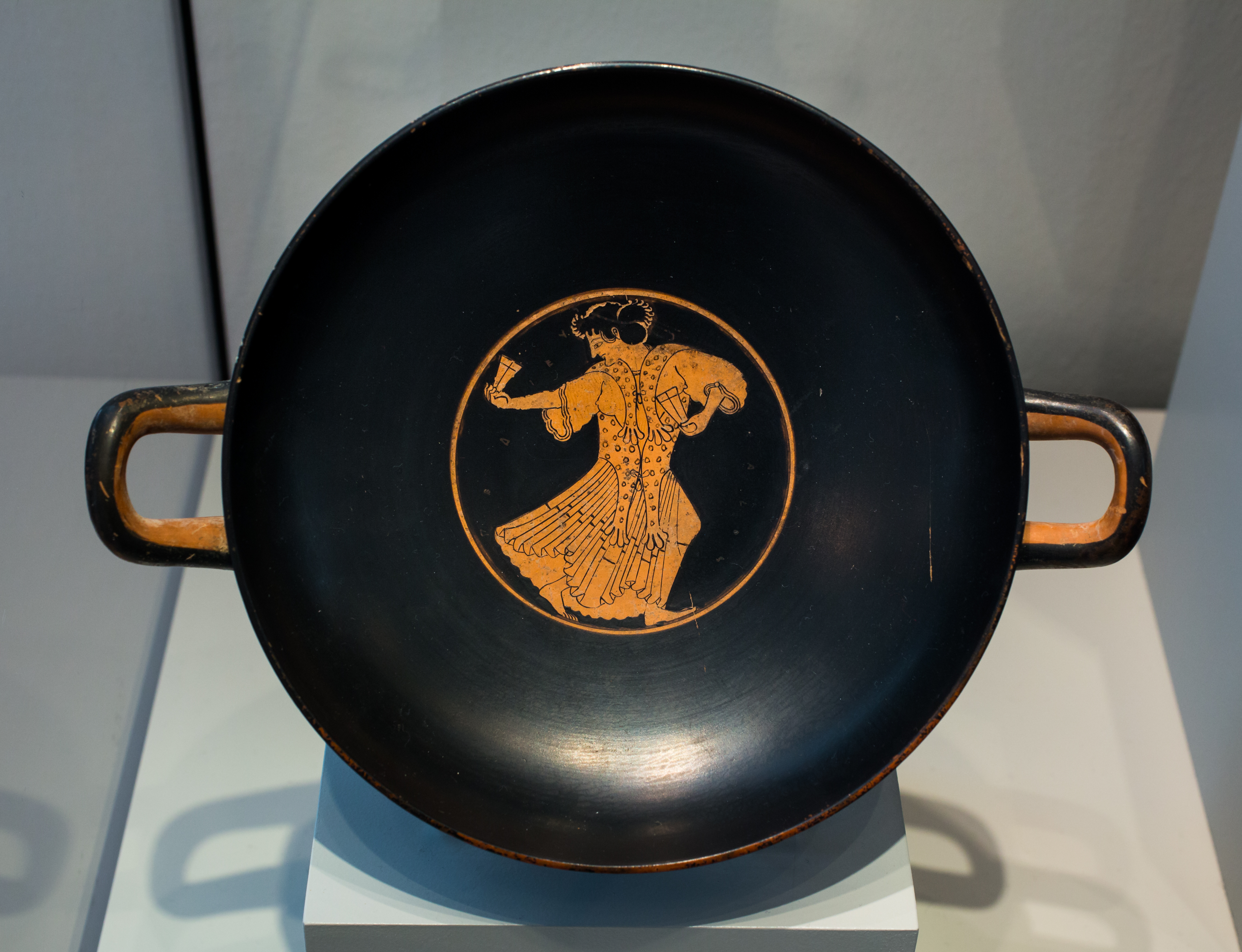
Circa 520-510 B.C., Athens. Dancing maenad with krotala.

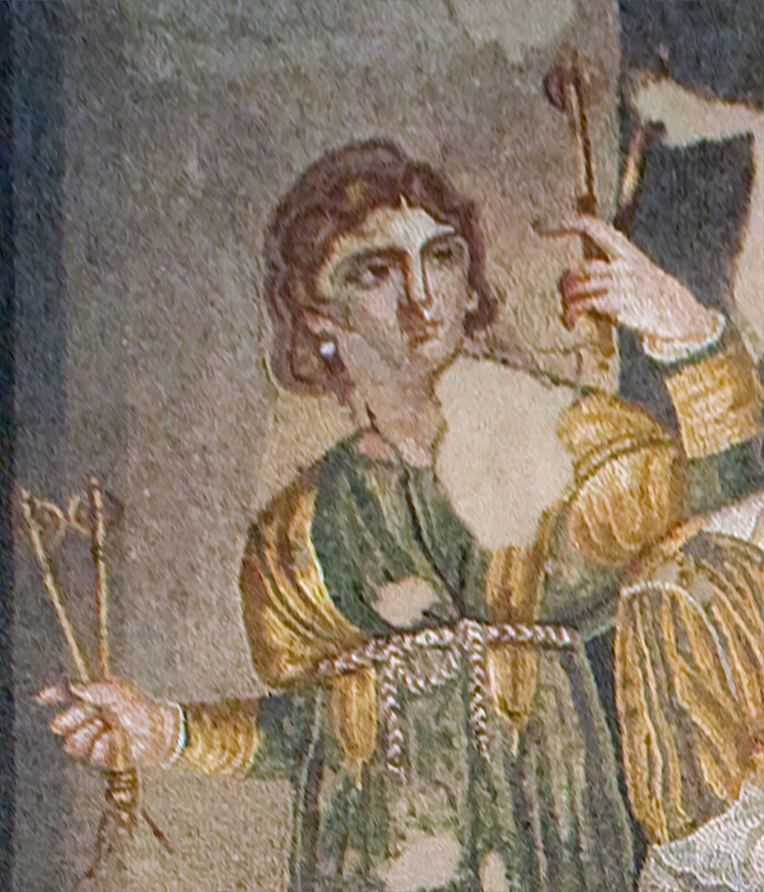
4th century A.D., Byzantine Empire. Krotala player, from the Mosaic of the Female Musicians, Mariamin. The crotala and cymbala were played by musicians in the same group.

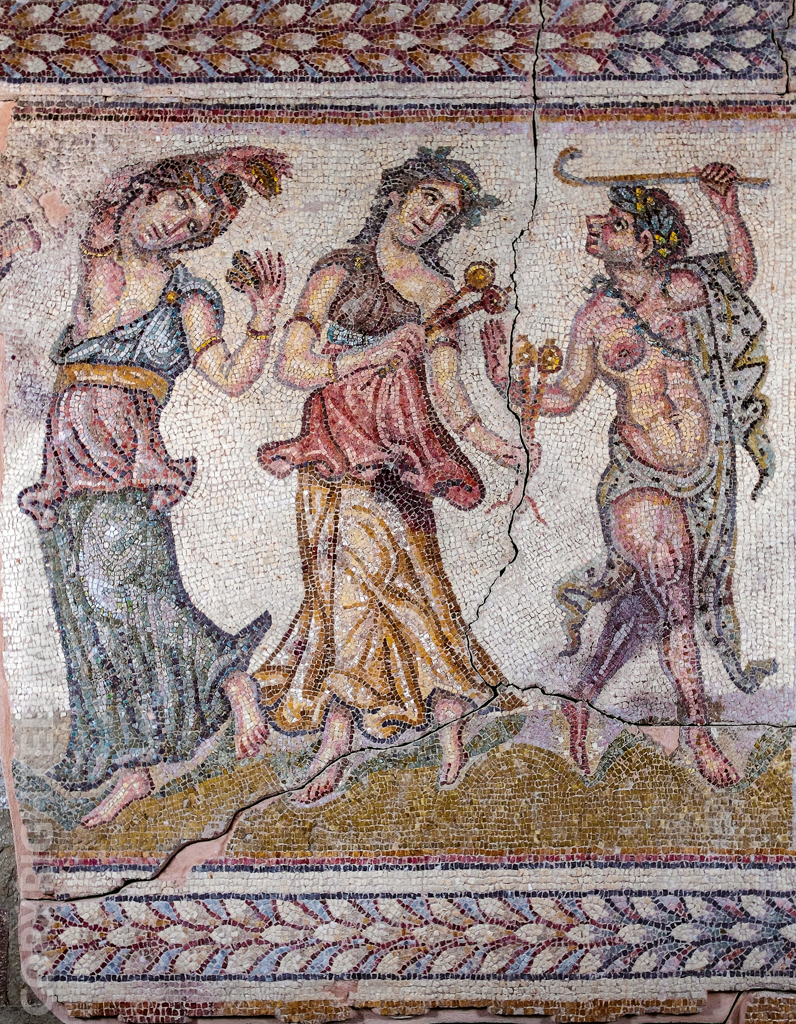
4th century A.D. Mosaic from the city of Augusta Traiana showing maenads dancing with Dionysus, playing krotalum and cymbalum (finger cymbals) .

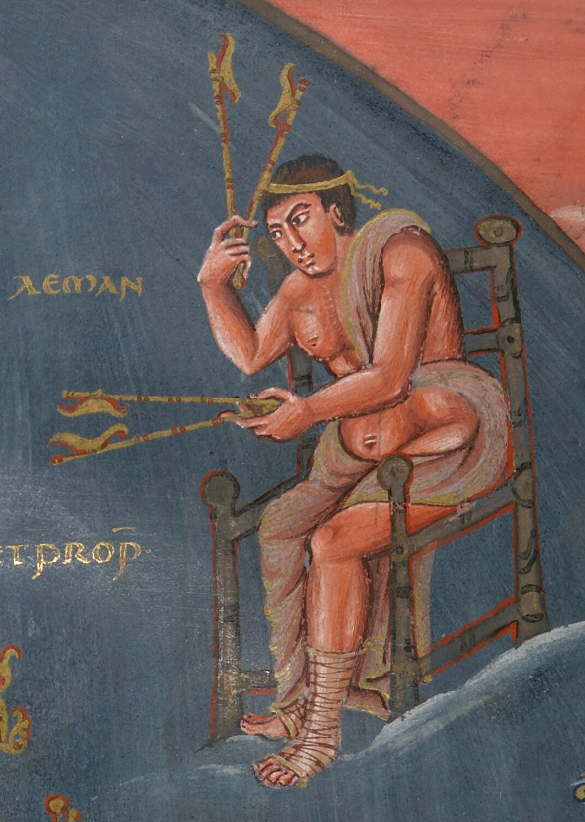
9th century A.D., Carolingian Empire. Aeman playing crotals, showing a blending of ancient traditions in the medieval period; in the Carolingian Renaissance, the Roman cymbala cymbals were attached to "forked sticks" to make the crotals.
