= Chime (bell instrument) =

Musical instrument of bells in the percussion family

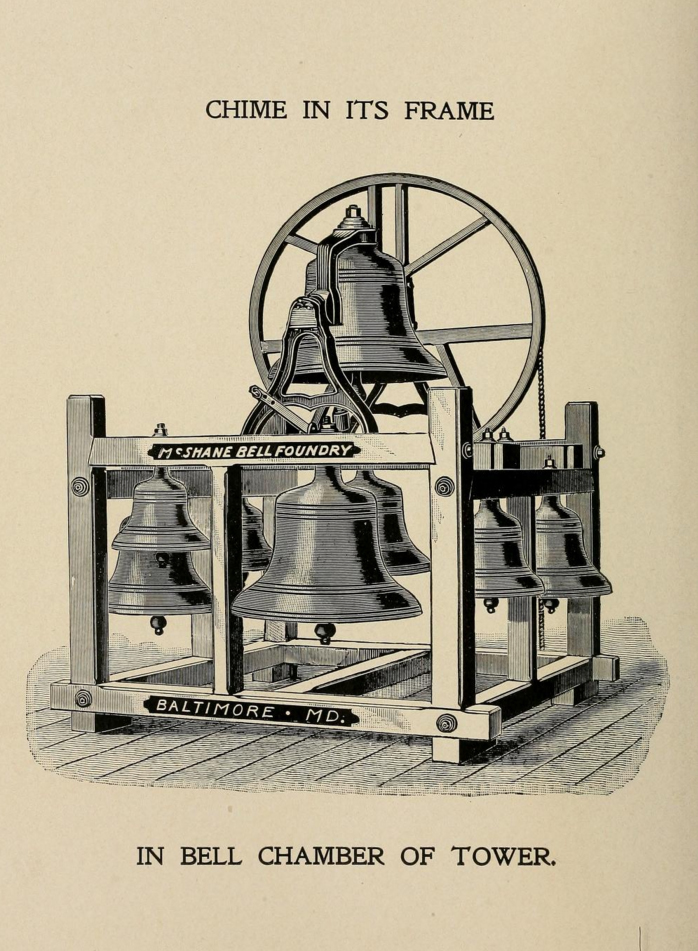
Eight-bell chime in its frame (McShane Bell Foundry, Maryland). Note that the bottom bells are static-chimes, and the top bell is also hung for swing-chiming on its own.

A chime (/ˈtʃaɪm/) or chime of bells is a carillon-like instrument, i.e. a pitched percussion instrument consisting of 22 or fewer bells. A Chime is primarily played with a keyboard, but can also be played with an Ellacombe apparatus. A Chime is often automated, in the past with mechanical drums connected to clocks and in the present with electronic action. Bellfounders often did not attempt to tune chime bells to the same precision as carillon bells. A chime of bells is defined as specifically having fewer than 23 bells to distinguish them from the carillon. American chimes usually have one to one and a half diatonic octaves. According to a recent count, there are over 1,300 existing chimes throughout the world. Almost all are in the Netherlands and the United States, with most of the remainder in Western European countries.

== Etymology ==
The word chime dates back to the 14th-century Middle English word chymbe, meaning 'cymbal'. It probably originates from the Old French chimbe or directly from the Latin cymbalum. The Latin word was shortened in Old French and misinterpreted as chymbe bellen in Middle English, where the meaning shifted by the mid-16th century to "set of bells in a church or clock tower, apparatus or arrangement for striking bells".

== Characteristics ==
=== Construction ===
There are several mechanisms of action for a chime. From the 13th century, a chime was connected to a system of ropes, which is rarely seen today. In the 19th century, many newly-constructed chimes were connected to a large wooden keyboard called a "chimestand." These resemble the console of a carillon, but with much larger keys, essentially handles, which are depressed a greater distance. In the 20th century, it is more common for a chime to be connected to an ivory piano keyboard with electronic action, often paired with automatic playing. A Chime may alternatively be connected to and played with an Ellacombe apparatus.

A Chime may also feature an automatic mechanism by which simple tunes or the Westminster Quarters are played. The mechanism on European chimes is often a playing drum, which is a large metal cylinder connected to a clock mechanism. Metal pegs are screwed onto the outside of the drum. When the clock mechanism sets the drum in motion, the pegs catch onto levers, which are connected to hammers that rest just a short distance from the outside of the bell. The hammers are briefly raised, and then fall onto the bell as the peg continues to rotate away from the lever. The pegs are arranged such that simple tunes can be programmed to play at specific quarter hours. In North America, automatic playing drum systems are not common; instead, chimes may have pneumatic systems which ring the instrument.

=== Sound ===
Chime bells are made of bell bronze, a specialized copper-tin alloy used for its above-average rigidity and resonance. A bell's weight and profile, or shape, determine its note and the quality of its tone. It produces a sound with overtones or partial tones which are not necessarily harmonically related. To produce a pleasing, harmonically related series of tones, the bell's profile must be carefully adjusted. Few chime bells have been tuned to the same precision as bells for carillons.

=== Range ===
The range of a chime is directly proportional to the number of bells it has. The instrument's total number of bells usually depends on funds available for the creation of the instrument: more money allows more bells to be cast, especially the larger, more costly ones. It is generally accepted that a chime has at most 22 bells; larger instruments are called carillons. In some cases, the World Carillon Federation may designate a chime constructed before 1940 as a historical carillon. The average chime has 8 to 15 bells arranged in a diatonic scale. Occasionally, chimes may include an extra B♭ or F♯ bell so that a wider range of melodies can be played.

== History ==
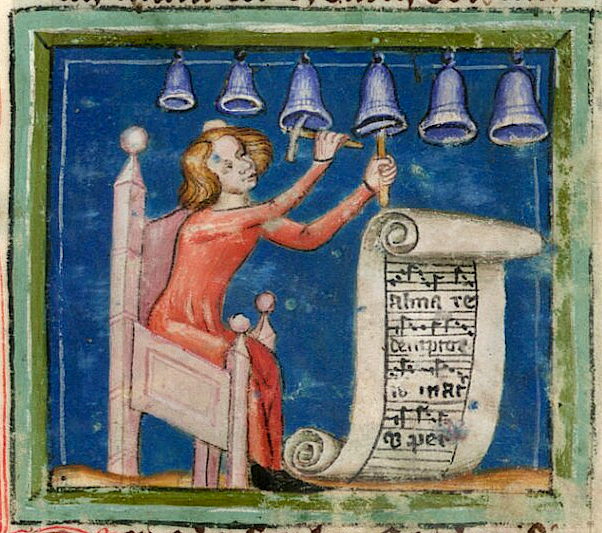
Set of chime bells (cymbala), circa 1370 A.D. Europeans developed chimes from wracks of small hammer-struck bells into large tower-mounted bells played with mechanized assistance.

The chime and the carillon's histories are mostly identical up until their debut in North America. In the late 18th century, a chime of 10 to 20 bells played with a large keyboard became fashionable in France and Great Britain and by the mid-19th century, they had become equally desirable in the United States. Between 1850 and 1930, hundreds of chimes were installed in churches, town halls, and other towers. The chime was the forerunner to the carillon in North America; the earliest carillons were installed during World War I.

The early chime market in North America consisted of the Meneely bell foundries, both located on the Hudson River in upstate New York; McShane in Baltimore, Maryland; Van Duzen in Cincinnati, Ohio; Jones in Troy, New York; and Stuckstede in St. Louis, Missouri. The Meneely foundries dominated the market; before both ceasing operations in the 1950s, they cast a combined total of more than 65,000 bells.

== Distribution ==
Chimes across the world are counted and registered by Tower Bells, among other bell instruments, which also publishes maps, technical specifications and statistics. According to TowerBells, there are over 1,300 existing chimes. They can be found on every continent except Antarctica; however, of the countries in which chimes can be found, only 16 have more than 10. The Netherlands and the United States account for over half of the world total. About 90 percent are located in either Western Europe or North America.

List of chimes by country
Country	Chimes
Antigua and Barbuda	1
Australia	34
Austria	8
Belgium	16
Bermuda	1
Brazil	2
Canada	79
Chile	1
Costa Rica	1
Croatia	1
Cuba	1
Curaçao (Netherlands)	6
Czech Republic	5
Democratic Republic of the Congo (Note: TowerBells still uses the former name Zaire to tally instruments in this country.)	1
Denmark	21
Egypt	1
England (United Kingdom)	63
Finland	4
France	76
Germany	68
Haiti	1
Hong Kong (China)	1
Hungary	1
Iceland	2
India	6
Ireland	5
Israel	2
Italy	12
Jamaica	1
Japan	18
Kenya	1
Liechtenstein	1
Luxembourg	2
Malawi	1
Malaysia	2
Malta	4
Mexico	3
Netherlands	157
New Zealand	17
Northern Ireland (United Kingdom)	3
Norway	11
Philippines	6
Poland	4
Portugal	1
Russia	1
Scotland (United Kingdom)	12
Slovakia	1
South Africa	6
Spain	11
Suriname	1
Sweden	6
Switzerland	35
Trinidad and Tobago	2
United States	596
Venezuela	1
Wales (United Kingdom)	2
Zimbabwe	1
World	1,327

== Notable chimes ==
- The Altgeld Chimes in the University of Illinois Urbana-Champaign's Altgeld Hall.
- The Cornell Chimes in Cornell University's McGraw Tower.

== See also ==
- Change ringing
- Full circle ringing
- Russian Orthodox bell ringing
