= Melodia (personification) =

Personification of Melody in medieval Byzantine iconography

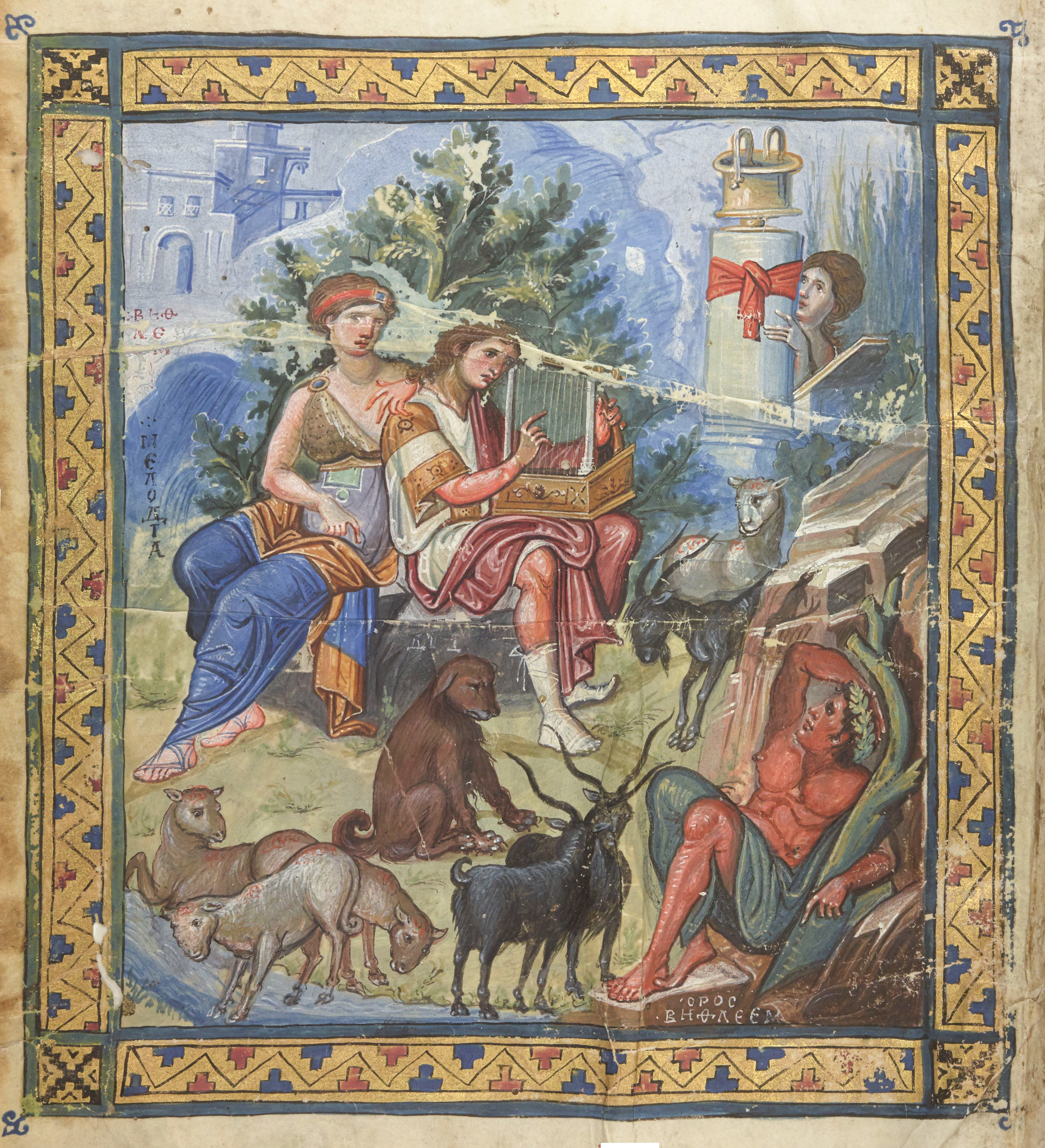
David composing the Psalms, with Melodia behind him (Paris Psalter)

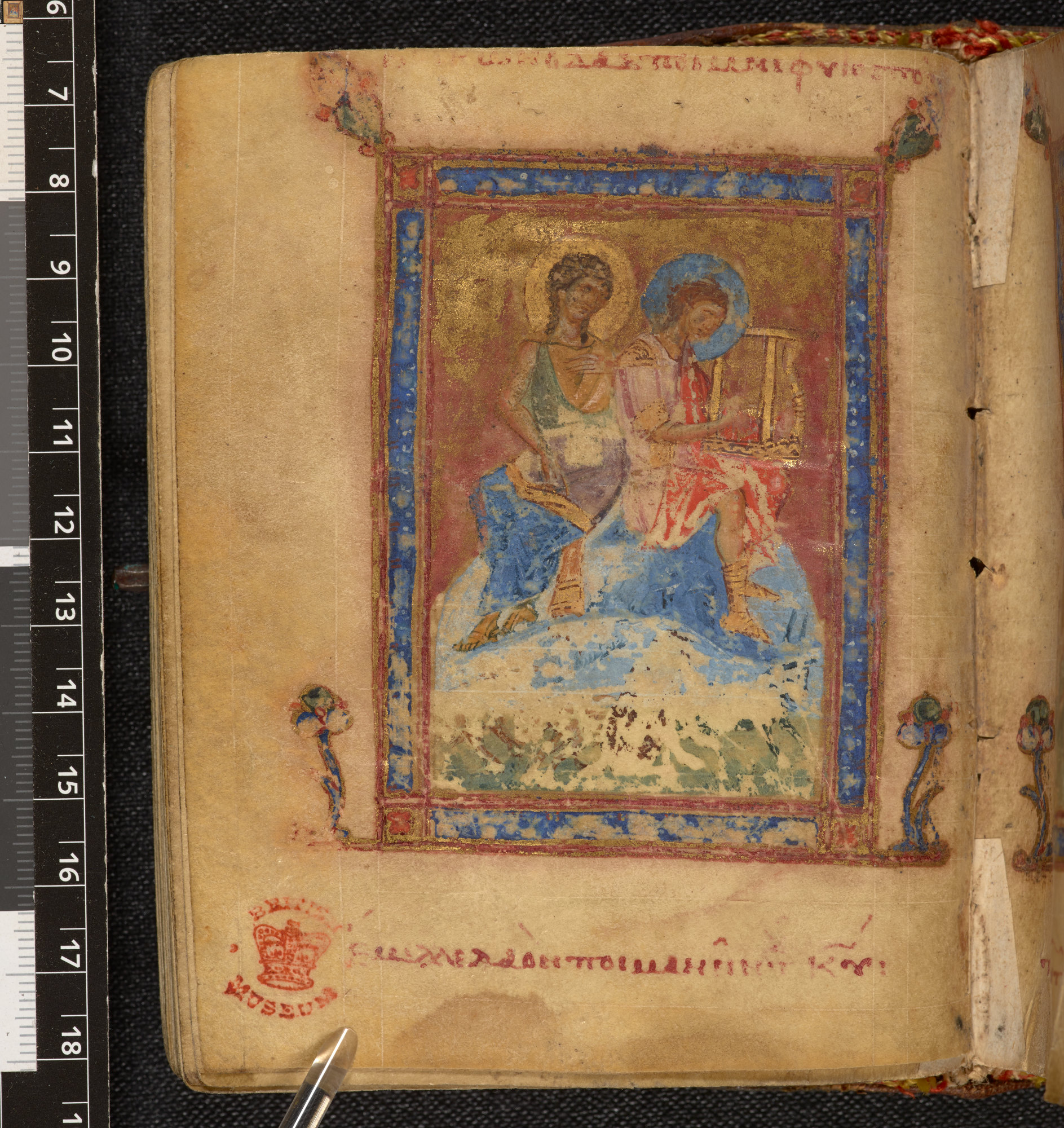
David and Melodia (Addit. MS. 36928)

Melodia (Greek: Μελῳδία, Melōidíā: 'singing, chanting; chant, choral song') is the personification of Melody in medieval Byzantine iconography. The motif is most associated with the "aristocratic" Psalters of the Middle Byzantine period, so-called because of the wealthy patrons for whom they were produced.

== History ==
=== Sacred ===
Melodia is typically shown as a companion of David the musician. In several illuminated Psalter manuscripts, such as the 10th-century Paris Psalter, she appears in the guise of a Muse seated on a rock beside the Psalmist, her arm upon his shoulder, and appearing to inspire him to compose the Psalms while he serenades his flock and various other animals. Here and elsewhere, David the shepherd and musician appears as Orpheus, inspired by the personification of Melodia.

Another example is in the British Library. Dated to about 1090 and produced in the Monastery of St. Sabba, near Jerusalem, it contains the Psalms and Canticles, and is decorated with a series of eight full-page miniatures, much rubbed but still legible. Six scenes intended to introduce the Book of Psalms illustrate important episodes in David's life. On f. 44v, David is shown playing the harp accompanied by Melodia, who rests comfortably by his shoulder.

The same figure of Melodia in the 11th-century Psalter in the Biblioteca Marciana in Venice is inscribed ἡ σύνεσις (he synesis: "intelligence").

=== Secular ===
This composition passed into secular art, serving as the centrepiece of a 12th-century silver bowl with a depiction of Digenes Akritas and Eudokia.
