= Tomić Psalter =

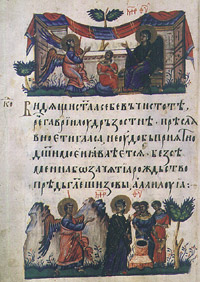
The Tomić Psalter (1360)

The Tomić Psalter (Bulgarian: Томичов псалтир, Tomichov psaltir) is a 14th-century Bulgarian illuminated psalter. Produced around 1360, during the reign of Tsar Ivan Alexander, it is regarded as one of the masterpieces of the Tarnovo literary and art school of the time. It contains 109 valuable miniatures.

Discovered in 1901 in Macedonia by the Serbian research-worker and collector Simon Tomić, whose name it bears, it is exhibited in the State Historical Museum in Moscow, Russia.

14th century A.D., Bulgaria. Exodus 15:20 "Then Miriam the prophetess, Aaron's sister, took a tambourine in her hand, and all the women followed her, with tambourines and dancing." Here the women use cymbals in Greek tradition and a drum.

== See also ==
- Sofia Psalter, 1337
- Gospels of Tsar Ivan Alexander, 1355–1356
