= List of bagpipes =

== Northern Europe ==
=== Ireland ===
- Uilleann pipes: Also known as Union pipes and Irish pipes, depending on era. Bellows-blown bagpipe with keyed or un-keyed 2-octave chanter, 3 drones and 3 regulators. The most common type of bagpipes in Irish traditional music.
- Great Irish Warpipes: One of the earliest references to the Irish bagpipes comes from an account of the funeral of Donnchadh mac Ceallach, king of Osraige in CE 927. Bagpipes were a noted instrument in Irish warfare since medieval times, but only became standardized in Irish regiments in the British Army in the last century, when the Great Highland Bagpipe became standard. The Warpipe differed from the latter only in having a single tenor drone. Irish warpipes fell out of use for centuries due to the British outlawing them; whence the Scottish bagpipes took the place of the Irish bagpipes role in the British army. Warpipes today are rarer specialty instruments in military and civilian pipe bands, or private players.
- Brian Boru bagpipes: Carried by the Royal Inniskilling Fusiliers and had three drones, one of which was a baritone, pitched between bass and tenor. Unlike the chanter of the Great Highland Bagpipe, its chanter is keyed, allowing for a greater tonal range.
- Pastoral pipes: Although the exact origin of this keyed, or un-keyed chanter and keyed drones (regulators), pipe is uncertain, it developed into the modern uilleann bagpipe.

=== Scotland ===
- Great Highland Bagpipe: This is perhaps the world's best-known bagpipe. It is native to Scotland. It has acquired widespread recognition through its usage in the British military and in pipe bands throughout the world. The bagpipe is first attested in Scotland around 1400, having previously appeared in European artwork in Spain in the 13th century. The earliest references to bagpipes in Scotland are in a military context, and it is in that context that the Great Highland bagpipe became established in the British military and achieved the widespread prominence it enjoys today.
- Border pipes: also called the "Lowland bagpipe" or "reel pipes", commonly confused with smallpipes, but louder. Played in the Lowlands of Scotland it is conically bored, made mostly from African blackwood like Highland pipes. Some makers have developed fully chromatic chanters.
- Pastoral pipes: Although the exact origin of this keyed, or un-keyed chanter and keyed drones (regulators), pipe is uncertain, it developed into the modern uilleann bagpipe.
- Scottish smallpipes: a modern re-interpretation of an extinct instrument.
- Reel pipes: also called "half-set," "kitchen pipes," or "parlour pipes." They are essentially a scaled down version of the Great Highland pipes, thus rendering them suitable for indoor playing.
- Zetland pipes: a reconstruction of pipes believed to have been brought to the Shetland Islands by the Vikings, though not clearly historically attested.

=== England and Wales ===
- English bagpipes: with the exception of the Northumbrian smallpipes, no English bagpipes maintained an unbroken tradition. However, various other English bagpipes have been reconstructed by Jonathan Swayne and Julian Goodacre.

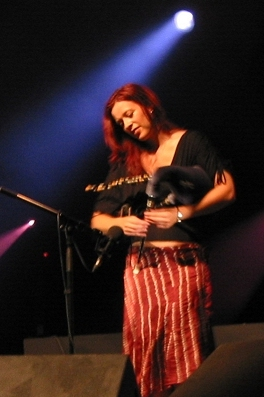
Kathryn Tickell playing a "16 keyed" Northumbrian smallpipe.

- Northumbrian smallpipes: a bellows-blown smallpipe with a closed end chanter played in staccato.
- Border pipes: also called the "Half-long pipes" in the North East, commonly confused with smallpipes, but louder. Traditionally played in Northern England as well as the Lowlands of Scotland. English border pipes have been reconstructed by Swayne, and they have in common with the Lowland Scottish pipes above 2-4 drones in a single stock, but the design of the chanter (melody pipe) is closer to the French cornemuse du centre and uses the same "half-closed" fingering system.
- Cornish bagpipes: an extinct type of double chanter bagpipe from Cornwall (southwest England); there are now attempts being made to revive it on the basis of literary descriptions and iconographic representations.
- Welsh pipes (Welsh: pibe cyrn, pibgod): Of two types, one a descendant of the pibgorn, the other loosely based on the Breton veuze. Both are mouthblown with one bass drone.
- Pastoral pipes: Although the exact origin of this keyed, or un-keyed chanter and keyed drones (regulators), pipe is uncertain, it was developed into the modern Uilleann bagpipe.
- Yorkshire bagpipes, known in Shakespeare's time, but now extinct
- Lincolnshire bagpipes, a one-drone pipe extinct by 1850, with one reproduction made in the modern era
- Lancashire bagpipes, widely mentioned in early-Modern literature and travel accounts

=== Finland ===
- Säkkipilli: The Finnish bagpipes died out but have been revived since the late 20th century by musicians such as Petri Prauda.
- Pilai: a Finnish bagpipe, described in 18th century texts as similar to the Ukrainian volynka.

=== Estonia ===
- Torupill: an Estonian bagpipe with one single-reeded chanter and 1-3 drones.^{MP3}

=== Latvia ===
- Dūdas: Latvian bagpipe, with single reed chanter and one drone.

=== Lithuania ===
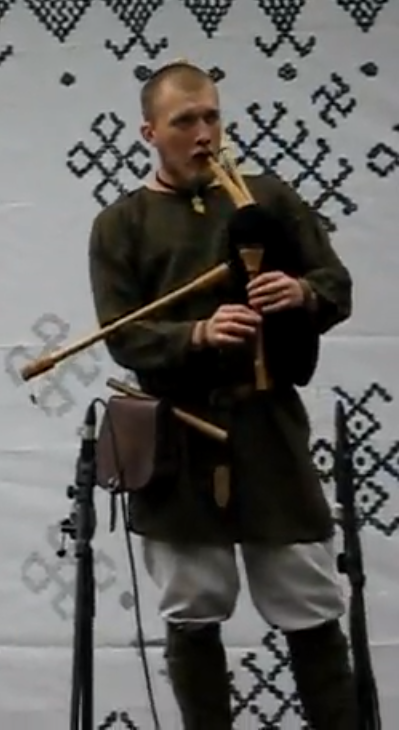
Piper playing Lithuanian bagpipes

- Dūdmaišis, or murenka, kūlinė, Labanoro dūda. A bagpipe native to Lithuania, with a single reed chanter and one drone.

=== Sweden ===
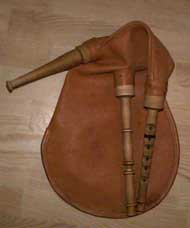
Traditional Swedish bagpipes, säckpipa, made by Leif Eriksson

- Säckpipa: Also the Swedish word for "bagpipe" in general, the name is commonly used for the revived Swedish bagpipe, based on surviving säckpipor of the Dalarna region. It has a cylindrical bore and a single reed, and usually a single drone in the same pitch as the bottom note of the chanter. There are around 20 surviving historical instruments in various museums and private collections.
- Walpipe, according to some 19th century anglophone sources a type of bagpipe used alongside "the Sakpipe" in Lapland during the 18th and 19th centuries. The only known description, as well as the name, in addition to it not being mentioned in any Swedish sources, suggests it's not a bagpipe but another name for the Swedish cowhorn.

== Southern Europe ==
=== Italy ===
- Zampogna (also called ciaramella, ciaramedda, or surdullina depending on style and or region): A generic name for an Italian bagpipe, with different scale arrangements for doubled chanters (for different regions of Italy), and from zero to three drones (the drones usually sound a fifth, in relation to the chanter keynote, though in some cases a drone plays the tonic).
- Piva: used in northern Italy (Bergamo, Emilia), Veneto and bordering regions of Switzerland such as Ticino. A single chantered, single drone instrument, with double reeds, often played in accompaniment to a shawm, or piffero.
- Müsa: played in Pavia, Alessandria, Genova and Piacenza.
- Baghèt: similar to the piva, played in the region of Bergamo, Brescia and, probably, Veneto.
- Surdelina: a double-chantered, bellows-blown pipe from Naples, with keys on both chanters and drones
- Launeddas: is a typical pipe from Sardinia but it is characterised by the absence of bags: the mouth works as bag.

=== Malta ===
- Żaqq (with definite article: iż-żaqq): The most common form of Maltese bagpipes. A double-chantered, single-reed, droneless hornpipe.
- Il-Qrajna: a smaller Maltese bagpipe

=== Bulgaria ===
Kaba gaida (Bulgarian: "Каба гайда"): a single-chantered bagpipe with a long separate drone, played in The Rodope mountains. This bagpipe has one, the lowest pitched drone of all bagpipes.

=== Greece ===
The ancient name of bagpipes in Greece is Askavlos (Askos Ασκός means wine skin, Avlos Αυλός is the pipe)

- Askomandoura (Greek: ασκομαντούρα): a double-chantered bagpipe used in Crete
- Tsampouna (Greek: τσαμπούνα): Greek Islands bagpipe with a double chanter. One chanter with five holes the second with 1,3 or 5 depending on the island. The tsambouna has no drone as the second chanter replaces the drone.
- Dankiyo or Tulum: traditional double-chantered bagpipes played by Pontic Greeks with the main difference being that the chanter in Dankiyo bagpipes are not explicitly defined as having two chanters, but, instead rely on two reeds in the chanter for the sound. While the Tulum uses two parallel chanters with two separate reeds in each chanter.

=== North Macedonia ===
Gaida (pronounced guy'-da) also known as meshnica (Macedonian: мешница) is the Macedonian name of the bagpipe (Macedonian: гајда). It's a folk musical wind instrument composed of a bag (Macedonian: мев), with three or four tubes for blowing and playing. The Macedonian bagpipe can be two-voiced or three-voiced, depending on the number of drone elements. The most common are the two-voiced bagpipes. The three-voiced bagpipes have an additional small drone pipe called slagarche (pronounced slagar'-che) (Macedonian: слагарче). They can be found in certain parts of Macedonia, most of them in Ovče Pole (Macedonian: Овчеполието). On the territory of Macedonia, there are two variants of the placement of the elements:

- The first variant, which is the most widespread, is when the blow pipe and the drone are place of the front legs, and the chanter goes at the head. The small drone goes between the blow pipe and the drone slightly towards the chanter.
- The second variant is found only in Radoviš and differs from the first in that the drone goes at the animal head while the chanter and the blow pipe are inserted at the legs. The small drone goes between the two legs.

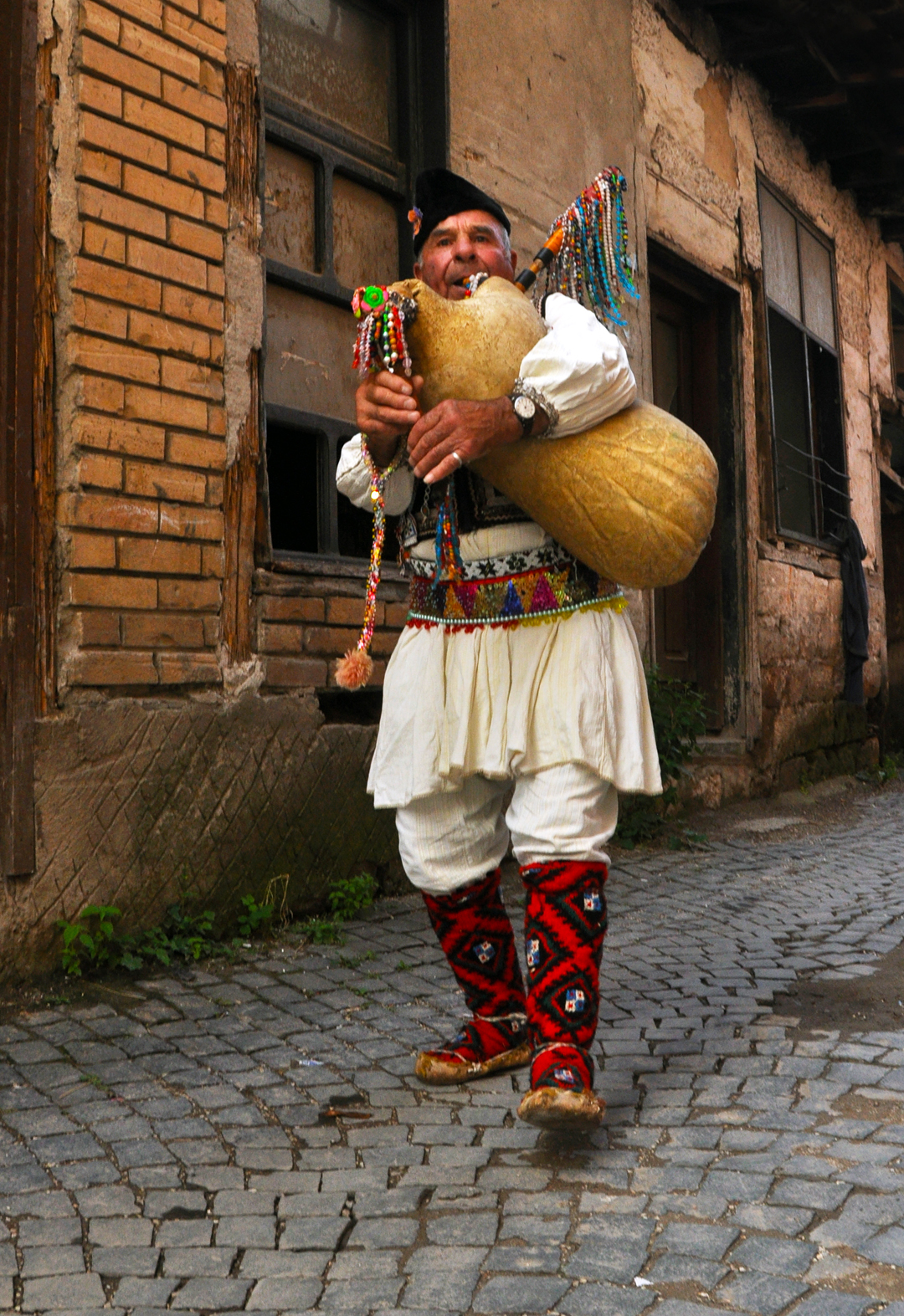
Macedonian bagpiper ГАЈДАЏИЈА

All bags for these types of bagpipes are made usually from the entire skin of a goat or sheep. The use of donkeyskin has also been reported in the past.

== Central and Eastern Europe ==
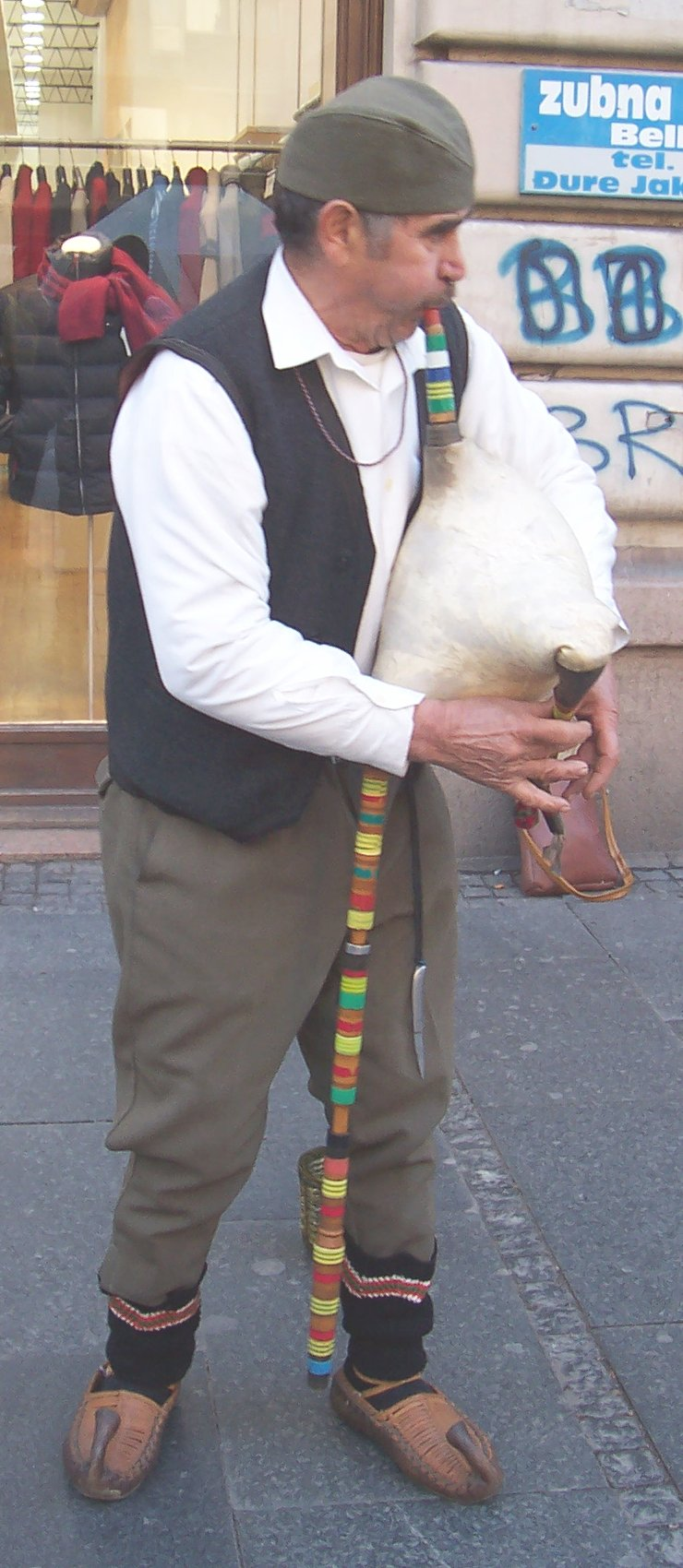
A Serbian bagpiper

- Dudy (also known by the German name Bock): Czech bellows-blown bagpipe with a long, crooked drone and chanter (usually with wooden billy-goat head) that curves up at the end.
- Dudy or kozoł (Lower Sorbian kózoł) are large types of bagpipes (in E flat) played among the (originally) Slavic-speaking Sorbs of Eastern Germany, near the borders with both Poland and the Czech Republic; smaller Sorbian types are called dudki or měchawa (in F). Yet smaller is the měchawka (in A, Am) known in German as Dreibrümmchen. The dudy/kozoł has a bent drone pipe that is hung across the player's shoulder, and the chanter tends to be curved as well.
- Parkapzuk (Armenian պարկապզուկ)
- Cimpoi is the name for the Romanian bagpipes. Two main categories of bagpipes were used in Romania: with a double chanter and with a single chanter. Both have a single drone and straight bore chanter and is less strident than its Balkan relatives.
- Magyar duda or Hungarian duda (also known as tömlősíp, bőrduda and Croatian duda) has a double chanter (two parallel bores in a single stick of wood, Croatian versions have three or four) with single reeds and a bass drone. It is typical of a large group of pipes played in the Carpathian Basin.

=== Poland ===
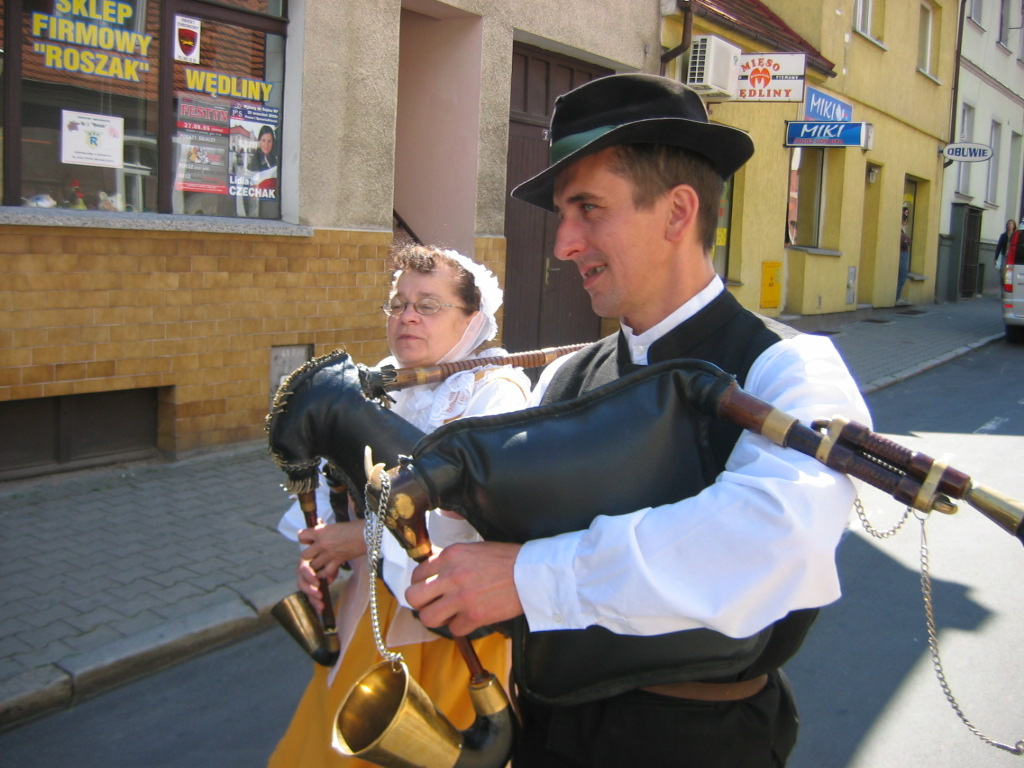
Dudy wielkopolskie (man) and Kozioł czarny (woman)

- Dudy is the generic term for Polish bagpipes, though since the 19th century they are usually referred to as kobza due to the confusion with koza and the relative obscurity of kobza proper in Poland. They are used in folk music of Podhale (koza), Żywiec Beskids and Cieszyn Silesia (dudy and gajdy), and mostly in Greater Poland, where there are four types of bagpipes:
  - Dudy wielkopolskie, "Greater Polish bagpipes", with two subtypes: Rawicz-Gostyń and Kościan-Buk;
  - Kozioł biały (weselny), "white (wedding) buck (used during wesele, the lay part of the wedding)";
  - Kozioł czarny ((do)ślubny), "black (wedding) buck (used during ślub, the religious part of the wedding)";
  - Sierszeńki, "hornets", a bladder pipe used as a goose (practice pipes).

=== Croatia ===
Istarski mih (Piva d'Istria): a double chantered, droneless Croatian bagpipe whose side by side chanters are cut from a single rectangular piece of wood. They are typically single reed instruments, using the Istrian scale.

=== The Balkans ===
- Kaba gaida: Kaba Gaida – low pitched single-drone bagpipe from the Rhodope Mountains in Bulgaria
- Gaida: Southern Balkan (e.g. Bulgarian, Greek and Albanian) bagpipe with one drone and one chanter. Also found in Macedonia and Serbia.
- Gajdy or gajde: the name for various bagpipes of Eastern Europe, found in Poland, Serbia, Slovakia, and Croatia.
- Duda, used in some parts of Croatia

=== Belarus ===
- Duda (Belarusian: Дуда) or Mutsianka (Belarusian: Муцянка) are the names of a Belarusian bagpipes.

=== Russia ===
- Volynka (Russian: Волынка) is a Russian bagpipe.

==== Finno-Ugric Russia ====
- Shyuvr, a bagpipe of the Volga-Finnic Mari people
- Puvama, a bagpipe of the Mordvin people

==== Turkic Russia ====
- Shapar, a bagpipe of the Turkic Chuvash people of the Volga region

=== Ukraine ===
- Duda (Ukrainian: Дуда) is a Ukrainian bagpipe.

== Western Europe ==
=== France ===
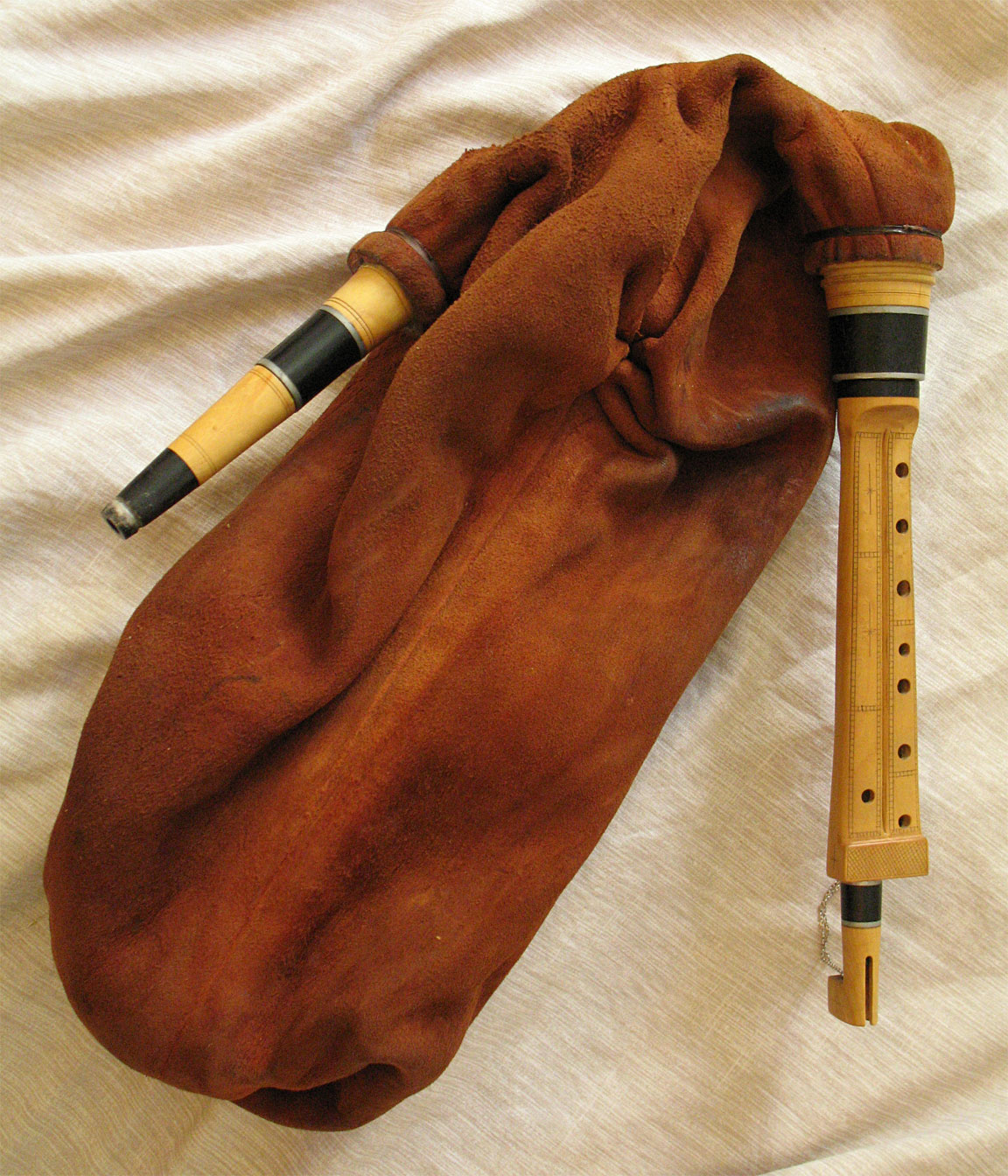
The boha of Gascony

- Musette de cour: A French open ended smallpipe, believed by some to be an ancestor of the Northumbrian smallpipes, used for classical compositions in 'folk' style in the 18th Century French court. The shuttle design for the drones was recently revived and added to a mouth blown Scottish smallpipe called shuttle pipes.
- Biniou (or biniou kozh "old style bagpipe"): a mouth blown bagpipe from Brittany. The great Highland bagpipe has also been used since the 20th century in marching bands called bagadoù and known as biniou braz ("great bagpipe").
- Veuze, found in Western France around Nantes, into the Breton marshes and in the very north of Poitou (Vendée).
- Cabrette: bellows-blown, played in the Auvergne region of central France.
- Chabrette (or chabretta): found in the Limousin region of central France.
- Bodega (or craba): found in Languedoc region of southern France, made of an entire goat skin.
- Boha: found in the regions of Gascony and Landes in southwestern France, notable for having no separate drone, but a drone and chanter bored into a single piece of wood.
- Musette bressane: found in the Bresse region of eastern France
- Cornemuse du Centre (or musette du Centre) (bagpipes of Central France) are of many different types, some mouth blown. They can be found in the Bourbonnais, Berry, Nivernais, and Morvan regions of France and in different tonalities.
- Chabrette poitevine: found in the Poitou region of west-central France, but now extremely rare.
- Caramusa: a small bagpipe with a single parallel drone, native to Corsica
- Musette bechonnet, named from its creator, Joseph Bechonnet (1820-1900 AD) of Effiat.
- Bousine, a small droneless bagpipe played in Normandy. (fr:Bousine)
- Loure, a Norman bagpipe which gives its name to the French Baroque dance loure.
- Pipasso, a bagpipe native to Picardy in northern France
- Sourdeline, an extinct bellows-blown pipe, likely of Italian origin
- Samponha, a double-chantered pipe played in the Pyrenees
- Vèze (or vessie, veuze à Poitiers), played in Poitou

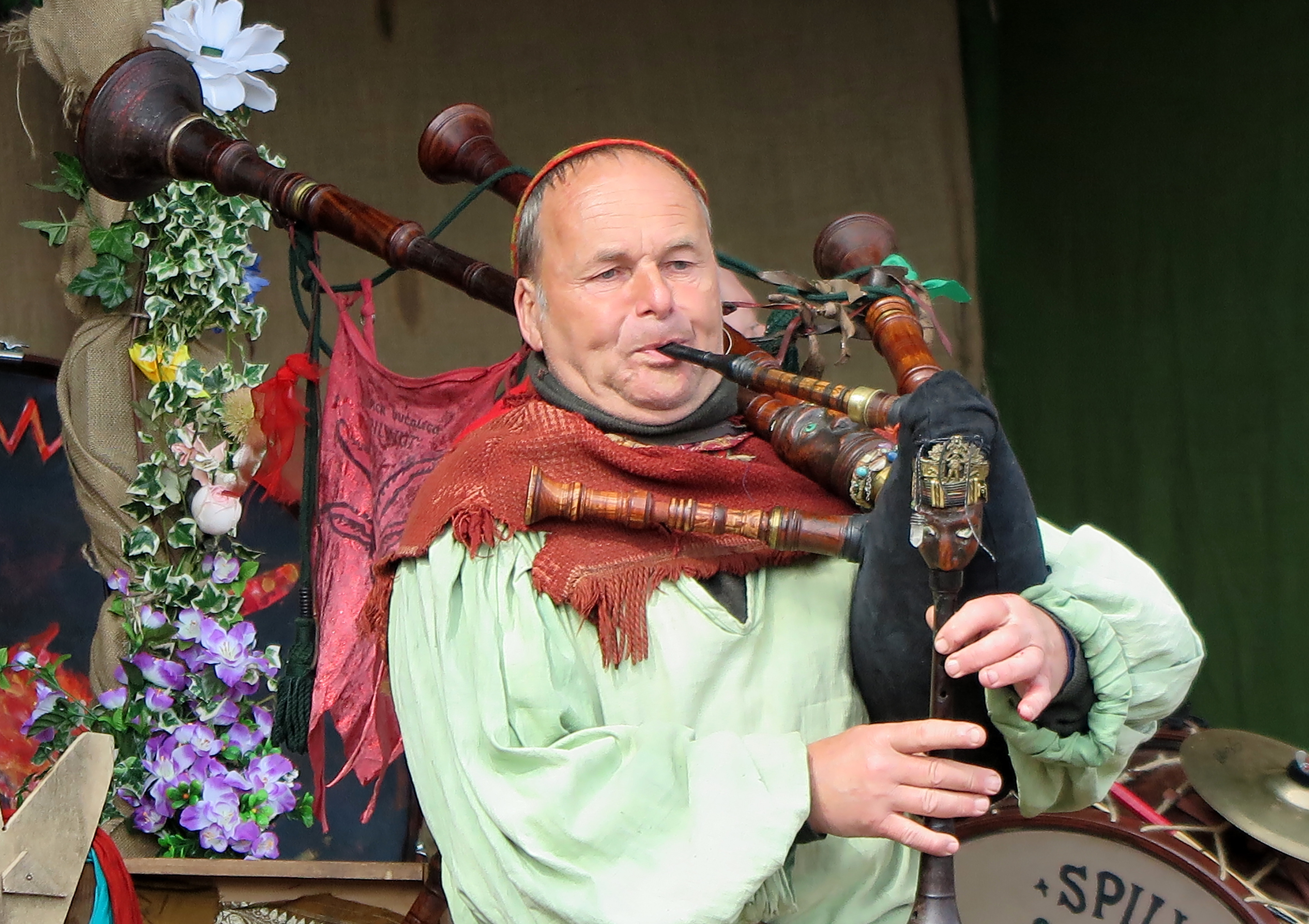
A Bagpipe Player is playing a Marktsackpfeife with four drones in Germany.

=== Spain and Portugal ===
Gaita is a generic term for "bagpipe" in Castilian (Spanish), Portuguese, Basque, Asturian-Leonese, Galician, Catalan and Aragonese, for distinct bagpipes used across the northern regions of Spain and Portugal and in the Balearic Islands. In the south of Spain and Portugal, the term is applied to a number of other woodwind instruments, a trait that the Moroccan ghaita also shares, since it originated in the southern Iberian Peninsula. The gaita finds near-cognates in Eastern European and Balkan countries where it is called gaida and gajdy. Just like the term "Northumbrian smallpipes" or "Great Highland bagpipes", each region attributes its toponym to the respective gaita name. Most of them have a conical chanter with a partial second octave, obtained by overblowing. Folk groups playing these instruments have become popular in recent years, and pipe bands have been formed in some traditions.

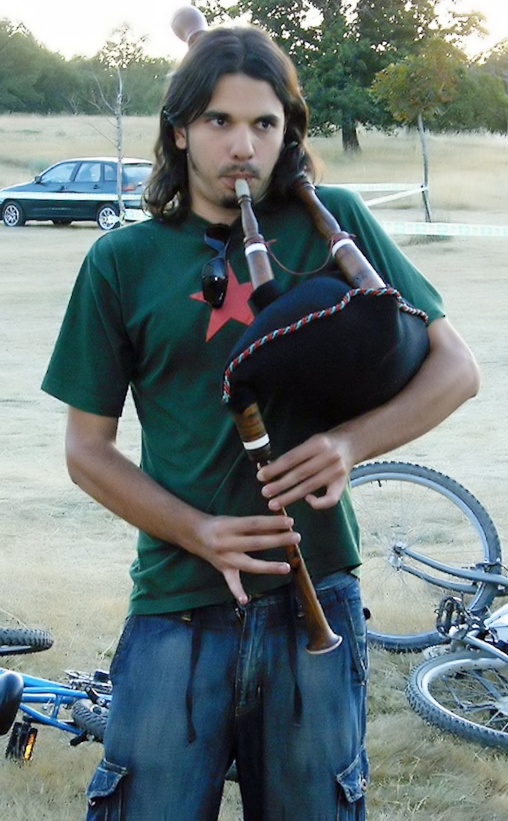
A piper with his gaita sanabresa

- Gaita alistana: played in Aliste, Zamora, north-western Spain.
- Gaita asturiana: native to Asturias, north-western Spain. Very similar to the gaita galega but of heavier construction with an increased capability for octave jumps and chromatic notes.
- Gaita de boto: native to Aragon, distinctive for its tenor drone running parallel to the chanter.
- Gaita cabreiresa (or gaita llionesa): an extinct but revived pipe native to León.
- Galician gaita: traditional bagpipe used in Galicia, north-west Spain and the Minho region, northern Portugal.
- Gaita de saco: native to Soria, La Rioja, Álava, and Burgos in northwestern-central Spain. Possibly the same as the lost gaita de fuelle of Old Castile.
- Gaita sanabresa: played in Puebla de Sanabria, in the Province of Zamora of north-western Spain.
- Gaita-de-foles mirandesa or gaita transmontana: native to the Miranda do Douro, Vimioso, Mogadouro and Bragança in Trás-os-Montes region, northern Portugal.
- Gaita-de-fole Coimbrã: native to Coimbra in Beira Litoral region, center Portugal.
- Odrecillo: a small medieval bagpipe, with or without drones.
- Sac de gemecs: used in Catalonia (north-eastern Spain).
- Xeremies: played in the island of Mallorca, accompanying the flabiol and drum.

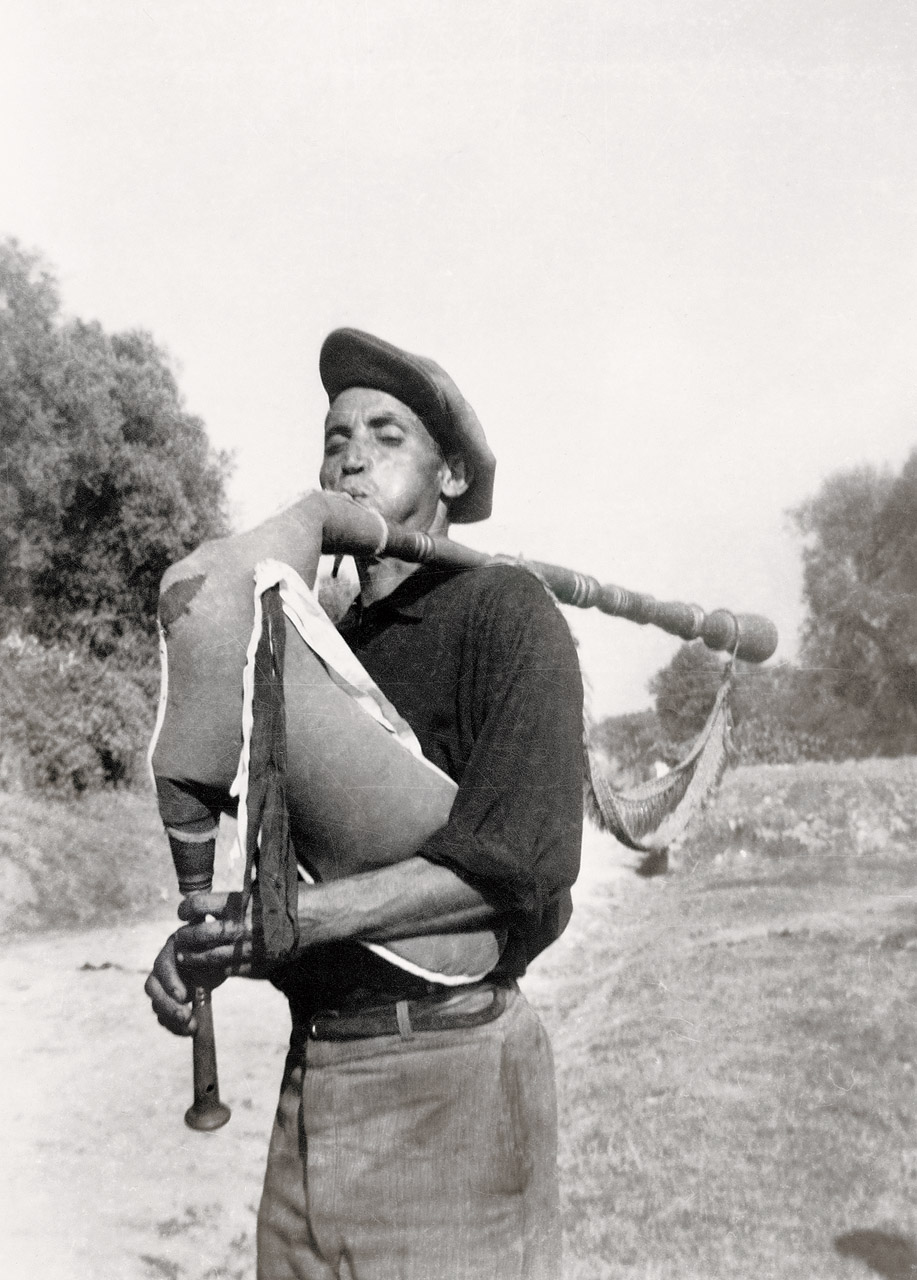
Old handmade Gaita Coimbrã. 1930, Armando Leça.

=== Germany ===
- Dudelsack: German bagpipe with two drones and one chanter. Also called Schäferpfeife (shepherd pipe) or Sackpfeife. The drones are sometimes fit into one stock and do not lie on the player's shoulder but are tied to the front of the bag. (see: de:Schäferpfeife)
- Marktsackpfeife: a bagpipe reconstructed from medieval depictions
- Huemmelchen: small bagpipe with the look of a small medieval pipe or a Dudelsack.
- Dudy or kozoł (Lower Sorbian kózoł) are large types of bagpipes (in E flat) played among the (originally) Slavic-speaking Sorbs of Eastern Germany, near the borders with both Poland and the Czech Republic; smaller Sorbian types are called dudki or měchawa (in F). Yet smaller is the měchawka (in A, Am) known in German as Dreibrümmchen. The dudy/kozoł has a bent drone pipe that is hung across the player's shoulder, and the chanter tends to be curved as well.

=== The Low Countries ===
- Doedelzak (or pijpzak): found in Flanders and the Netherlands, this type of bagpipe was made famous in the paintings of Pieter Brueghel the Elder; died out, but revived in the late 20th century.
- Muchosa (or muchosac): found in the Hainaut province of Wallonia, in southern Belgium, and previously known down into the north of France as far as Picardy

=== Switzerland ===
- Schweizer Sackpfeife (Swiss bagpipe): In Switzerland, the Sackpfiffe was a common instrument in the folk music from the Middle Ages to the early 18th century, documented by iconography and in written sources. It had one or two drones and one chanter with double reeds.

=== Austria ===
- Bock (literally, male goat): a bellows-blown pipe with large bells at the end of the single drone and chanter

== West Asia ==
=== Turkey ===
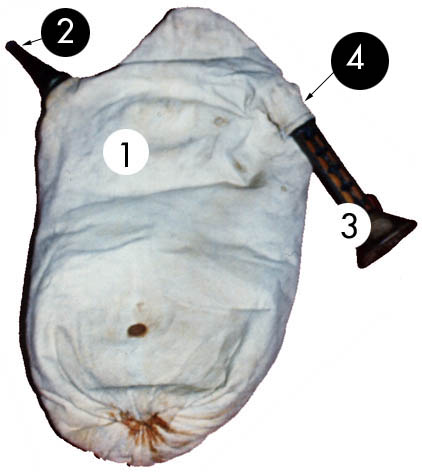
Pontic bagpipe/dankiyo/tulum consist of: 1. Post - Skin (bag): Animal Skin, 2. Fisaktir - blowpipe: Wood or Bone, 3. Avlos - flute: Wood & Reeds, 4 . Kalame - Reeds: Reeds

- Dankiyo: A word of Greek origin for "bagpipe" used in the Trabzon Province of Turkey.
- Tulum or Guda: double-chantered, droneless bagpipe of Rize and Artvin provinces of Turkey. Usually played by the Laz and Hamsheni people.
- Karkm, a bagpipe of the Turkish Turkmen nomads (Yörük)

=== Armenia ===
- Parkapzuk (Armenian: Պարկապզուկ): A droneless horn-tipped bagpipe played in Armenia

=== Azerbaijan ===
- Tulum (Azerbaijani: Tulum) or Tulug (Azerbaijani: Tuluq): double-chantered, droneless bagpipe native to Azerbaijan. Used to be common in Nakhchivan, Karabakh and Gazakh. Now only used in Nakhchivan Autonomous Republic. Sometimes used alongside Balaban.

=== Georgia ===
- Gudastviri (Georgian: გუდასტვირი): A double-chantered horn-tipped bagpipe played in Georgia. Also called a chiboni or stviri.

=== Iran ===
- Ney anban (Persian: نی انبان): a droneless double-chantered pipe played in Southern Iran

=== Bahrain ===
- Jirba (جربة): a type of double-chantered droneless bagpipe, primarily played by the ethnic Iranian minority of Bahrain.

=== Arabian Peninsula ===
- Habbān (هبان): a generic term covering several types of bagpipes, including traditional Bedouin bagpipes in Kuwait, and a modern version of the Great Highland Bagpipes played in Oman.

== North Africa ==
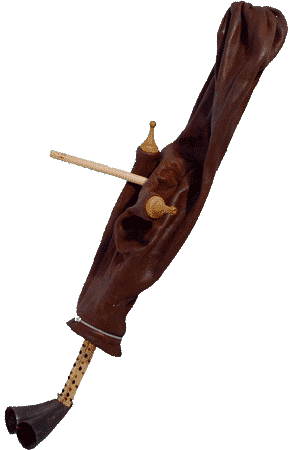
The Tunisian mizwad

=== Egypt ===
- Zummarah-bi-soan, a small Egyptian double-bagpipe

=== Libya ===
- Zukra (Arabic: زكرة): famous in Libya bagpipe with a double-chanter terminating in two cow horns.

=== Tunisia ===
- Mizwad (Arabic: مِزْود; plural مَزاود mazāwid): Tunisian bagpipe with a double-chanter terminating in two cow horns.

=== Algeria ===
- Tadghtita, a Berber bagpipe

== South Asia ==
=== India ===
- Mashak, a bagpipe of Rajasthan, Uttarakhand, and Uttar Pradesh in northern India. The term is also used for the Highland pipes which have displaced the traditional bagpipe over time, such as the mushak baja (Garhwali : मूषक बाजा): in Garhwal region. or masak-been (Kumaoni : मसकबीन): of the Kumaon Division.
- Titti (bagpipe), a Telugu bagpipe of Andhra Pradesh
- Sruti upanga, a bagpipe of Tamil Nadu primarily used for drone accompaniment

== Non-traditional bagpipes ==
- Electric bagpipes, bagpipes fitted with an amplifying pickup
- Electronic bagpipes, an electronic musical instrument designed to look and sound like bagpipes
