= Croatian bagpipes =

There are several types of Croatian bagpipes, they are:

- Slavonske gajde - a bagpipe with double chanter and a single drone
- Duda - a bagpipe with triple/quadruple chanter and a single drone. Two versions exist, one from Podravina and one from Bilogora
- Istarski mih - a bagpipe with double chanter and no drone
- Dalmatinski mih - Diple - a bagpipe with double chanter and no drone
- Hercegovački mih - a bagpipe with double chanter and no drone
- Mih s Pelješca - a bagpipe with double chanter and no drone
- Surle - a bagpipe with double chanter and no drone
