= Bagpipes of the Middle East and Persian Gulf =

There are several bagpipes of the Middle East and Persian Gulf, with local cultural differences. There are several Arabic terms for the bagpipes, including habbān (هبان), jirbah (جربة). It is similar to the (Persian) ney-anbān.

== Habbān ==
Habban
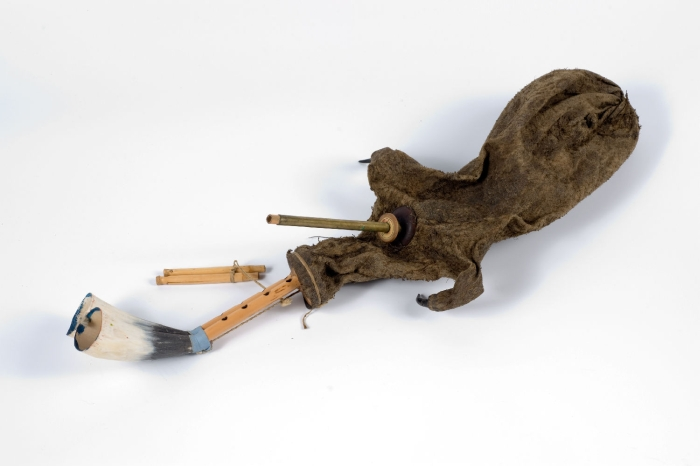
- Habbān (jirbah)
- Other names: هبان
- Classification: Bagpiping

Related instruments
- Ney anban (Iran); Bock (Central European); Cimpoi (Romanian); Duda (Hungarian/Polish); Koza (Polish); Diple (Dalmatian Coast); Mih (Istrian); Tulum (Turkish and Pontic); Tsambouna (Dodecanese and Cyclades); Askambandoura (Crete); Gajdy (Polish/Czech/Slovak); Gaita (Galician)([Asturian]); Surle (Serbian/Croatian); Mezoued/Zukra (Tunisia/Libya); Guda, tulum (Laz people); Dankiyo, zimpona (Pontic); Parakapzuk (Armenia); Gudastviri (Georgia (country)); Tsimboni (Georgia (country) )(Adjara); Shuvyr (Circassians ); Sahbr, Shapar (Chuvashia); Tulug (Azerbaijan); Volynka (Ukrainian: Волинка), (Russian: Волынка) (Ukraine, Russia); Swedish bagpipes (Sweden); Zampogna (Italy)

The habbān (or hibbān) is a type of bagpipe used in the coastal regions of the Persian Gulf (especially Bahrain, Palestine, and Kuwait). The term is drawn from Hanbān (هنبان), the Persian word for "bag". In Gulf states the term habban refers to the traditional Holi (inhabitants of the eastern coast of the Persian Gulf) bagpipe.

While the term itself is generic, in Oman the term habban is used specifically for a nativized variant of the Great Highland bagpipe that has been incorporated into local music.

== Jirba ==
The jirba (Arabic: قربة (also spelled جربة; also transliterated dzirba, girba) is a traditional folk instrument from Bahrain and Kuwait. It is a droneless, double-reeded, single-chantered bagpipe, played particularly by ethnic Iranians, as well as on the Kuwaiti island of Faylaka. The bag is usually made from the skin of a goat, and filled with air via the mouth. The lower part of the bag is attached to a wooden flute like instrument which has either 4 or 6 holes. The two reeds are positioned side by side which produce a harmonious double note.

== Ney-anbān ==
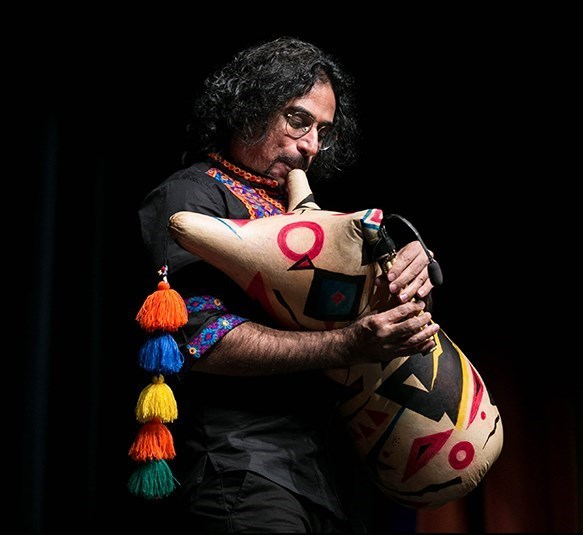

Ney anban
- Other names: نی انبان
- Classification: Bagpipe

Related instruments
- Jirba

Ney-anbān (Persian: نی انبان, numerous Latin spellings), is a type of bagpipe which is popular in southern Iran, especially around Bushehr. The term ney-anban literally means "bag pipe", but more specifically can refer to a type of droneless double-chantered bagpipes played in Southern Iran. In Bushehr, the ney-anban is used to accompany sarva, the singing of free-metre couplets.

=== Orthography ===
Latin spelling of the name of this pipe include: ney-hanbān, ney-anbun, ney ammbooni, nai-ambana hanbun, hanbuneh, nay-anban.

== See also ==
- List of bagpipes#Southwest Asia
