= Kaba gaida =

Musical instrument

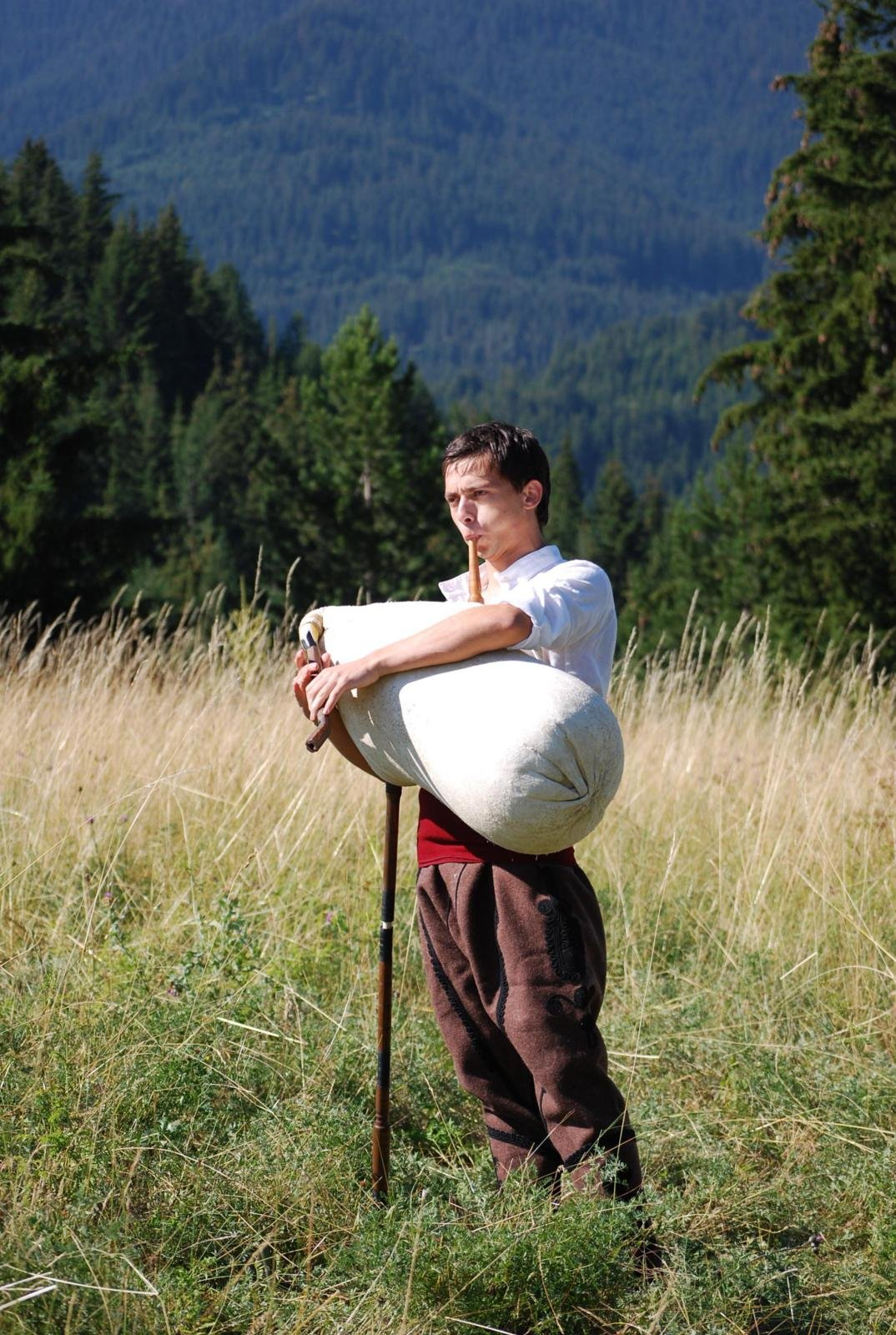

Woodwind instrument
- Classification: Bagpipe
- Hornbostel–Sachs classification: 422.112 (Reed aerophone with conical bore)

Related instruments
- Bock (Czech); Cimpoi (Romanian); Duda (Hungarian/Polish/Ukrainian); Koza (Polish/Ukrainian); Diple (Dalmatian Coast); Mih (Istrian); Tulum (Turkish and Pontic); Tsambouna (Dodecanese and Cyclades); Askomandoura (Crete); Mishnica (Albania/Kosovo); Gajdy (Polish/Czech/Slovak); Gaita (Galician)([Asturian]); Surle (Serbian/Croatian); Mezoued/Zukra (Northern Africa); Guda, tulum (Laz people); Dankiyo, zimpona (Pontic); Parakapzuk (Armenia); Gudastviri (Georgia (country)); Tsimboni (Georgia (country) )(Adjara); Shuvyr (Circassians ); Sahbr, Shapar (Chuvashia); Tulug (Azerbaijan); Volynka (Ukrainian: Волинка), (Russian: Волынка) (Ukraine, Russia); Swedish bagpipes (Sweden); Ney anban (Iran)

The kaba gaida ('large gaida') or rodopska gaida (Rhodope gaida), is the bagpipe of the central Rhodope Mountains, it is a distinctive symbol of Bulgarian folk music. It is made from wood, horn, animal skin and cotton, and is similar to the gaida, but lower pitched and usually with a larger bag. The chanter has a specific curve at the end, with a hexagonal section, and the shape of the channel inside the chanter is reverse cone. The most common drone tone on a kaba gaida is E.

The song "Izlel e Delio Haidutin", played on the kaba gaida and included on the Voyager Golden Record, was among the sounds selected to portray the diversity of human culture.

The gaida is played on weddings, celebrations and events. As people on the Balkans say: "A wedding without a bagpipe is like a funeral." Interest in the kaba gaida has been increasing and it is found on the ethno jazz scene.
