= Gaita transmontana =

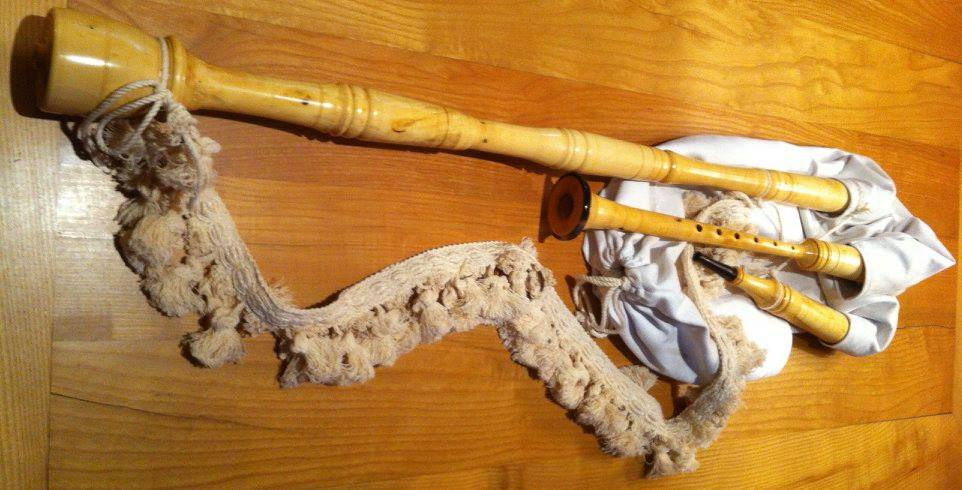
Gaita Mirandêsa

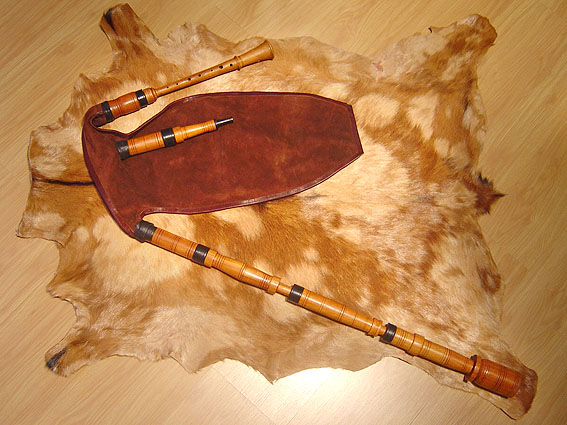
Gaita-de-fole transmontana.

The gaita de foles mirandesa is a type of bagpipe native to the Trás-os-Montes region of Portugal.

== Etymology ==
There are different theories regarding the origins of the name gaita. It bears similarities with eastern European names for bagpipes, such as the Bulgarian kaba gaida and the Slovak gajdy (plurale tantum). The linguist Joan Coromines has suggested that the Galician-Portuguese word likely derives from the Gothic word gait or gata, meaning "goat"; as the bag of a gaita is made from a whole, case-skinned goat hide. Gothic was spoken in Hispania from the fifth to the eighth century when the country was ruled by the Visigoths. The Visigoths originated in north-eastern Europe, which could explain some lexical similarities in old Galician-Portuguese.

== History ==
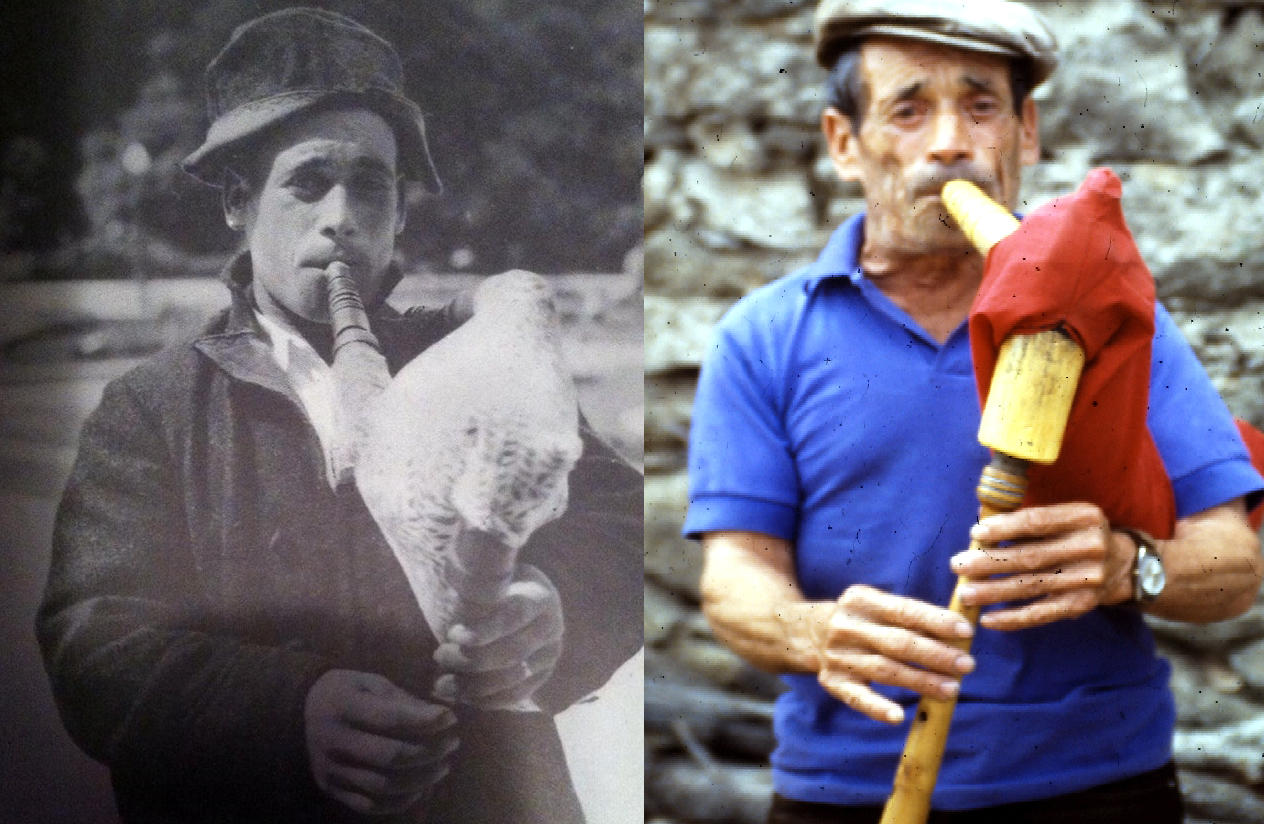
Famous Gaiteiro Mirandês: Known as 'Tiu Pascoal', in 1960 and 1991

The oldest records of this Aroephonde de monica date from the 18th century, mostly written. Its culture has been passed since then from father to son until the 20th century, with some small differences from region to region. In Portugal, it can be found in Trás-os-Montes region, especially in Vinhais, Bragança, Miranda and Mogadouro, and in the central regions of Guarda and Castelo Branco mainly.

Some Portuguese regiments from Minho, Trás-os-Montes and Guarda used the bagpipes to mark the marching cadence, although the standard marching pattern of the Portuguese infantry regiments was the same as the French. Northern Portugal is a very mountainous region, where the sound of bagpipes can be heard miles away due to the resonance effect created by the humidity and altitude. The gaita transmontana has a peculiarly grave tone, which produces a distinct low pitch. In fact, numerous written records of French commanders during the Peninsular War noted the intimidating effect the sound had on foot soldiers, specially at night, daunted by such uncanny sound.

Only recently this type of bagpipe has been recovered through the gathering of repertoires, aided by the promotion of the instrument from several bagpipe associations from Portugal and Galicia in Mexico.

== Terminology ==
It is often called “Gaita Transmontana” by foreigners (referring to the Trás-os-Montes region), somewhat incorrectly. The bagpipe is native to the specific Tierra de Miranda, comprising the municipalities of Miranda de l Douro, Bumioso and Mogadouro. Trás-os-Montes encompasses a whole geographic province where this type of bagpipe doesn't occur. Miranda is also closely related to Leon-Asturias, in Northwestern Spain, both linguistically (see Asturleonese language(s)) and culturally. The traditional Mirandese bagpipe is closer to the Gaita asturiana than to other regional Portuguese variations.

The Portuguese Ministry of Culture officially recognized, in 2007, that Gaita Mirandesa is the correct term for the instrument, and that Gaita Transmontana should no longer be used because it is inaccurate.

== Repertoire ==
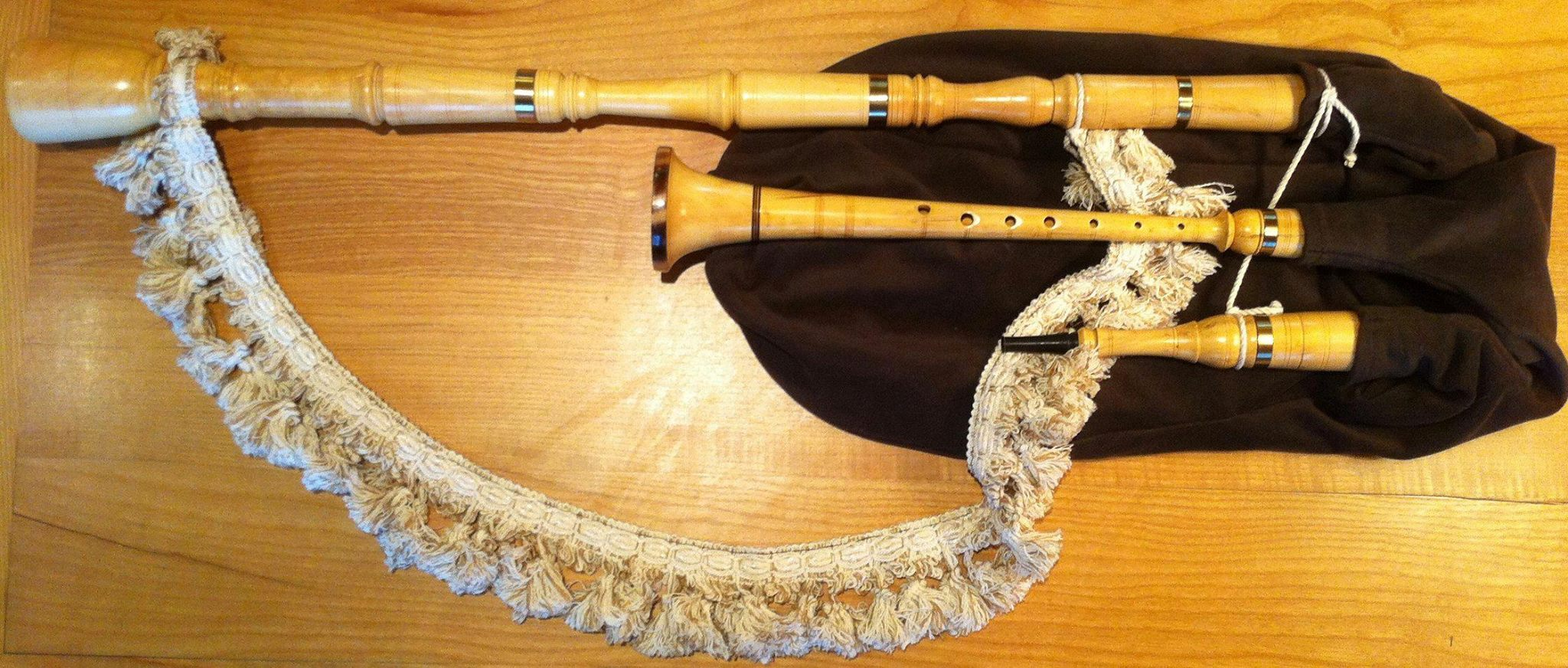
Replica of a historical Gaita

Unlike the Galician bagpipe or especially the Great Highland Bagpipe transmission and revival, the renewed musical interest on the Mirandese bagpipe is more recent and limited. It's repertoire remains almost entirely traditional, with few modern compositions taking place. This is partly due to the historical decline of the instrument. With urbanisation, ancient oral traditions and skills stopped being transferred from generation to generation, similar to the case of the säckpipa and other musical instruments and traditions. There is however a wealth of old recordings and instruments collections carefully preserved by numerous ethnomusicologists.

== See also ==
- Galician gaita
- Gaita asturiana
- List of bagpipes
