= Gaita de saco =

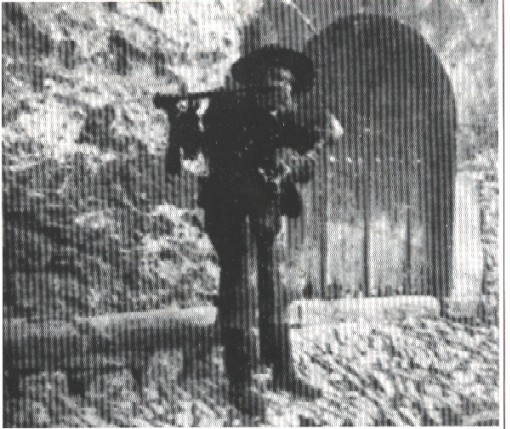
El tío Frescas, gaitero de Ventrosa (La Rioja) hacia 1920.

The gaita de saco (or de bota) is a type of bagpipe native to the provinces of Soria, La Rioja, Álava, and Burgos in north-central Spain. In the past, it may also have been played in Segovia and Ávila.

It consists of a single chanter (puntero) holding a double reed which plays the melody, and single drone (ronco), which has a single reed and plays a constant bass note.

In La Rioja, the instrument is called bota or gaita de bota, supposedly to differentiate it from the folk oboe also called gaita. Its use in the past was more extensive throughout the regional valleys, but is now reduced to a zone around the high Najerilla until the 1950s when it disappeared along with the traditional dances to which was historically linked. Currently, the instrument is being revived along with the traditional dances in certain villages, such as Ventrosa de la Sierra and Viniegra de Arriba.

The name is clearly related to the gaita gallega and gaita asturiana, with the only distinctive feature of the gaita de saco being its louder sound. Currently the gaita de saco is generally made in C or B-flat.

== See also ==
- Gaita
