= Walpipe =

The walpipe is an instrument described by some anglophone sources as a bagpipe used in Lapland.

This is likely derived from, and possibly a misunderstanding of, the description of a "walpipe" mentioned in the meeting minutes of the Society of Antiquaries, May 10, 1770. In the text, Daines Barrington is referring to a discussion he had with a Mr Fougt of Lapland, possibly Swedish bookprinter Henric Fougt (1720-1782):

Mr Barrington further mentions, that he enquired of Fougt, whether they had any other antient [sic] Instruments in Lapland of Sweden: On which he mention’d Two, viz. the Sakpipe, & the Walpipe; which he describes to be exactly the same with the Bagpipe.

Should the Scots dispute the Invention of this antient [sic] Instrument, Mr Barrington think it is full as probable, that they borrowed it from the Nowegians [sic], as that the Swedes learned the Use of the Bagpipe from them.

The Walpipe is used by the Lapland Shepherds, & consists of a Cow’s Horn, in which they make Apertures at proper Distances, so as to produce musical Intervals.

It is unclear from the text whether Mr Fougt meant the Sakpipe or the Walpipe or both to be "exactly the same with the Bagpipe". The following description of the Walpipe as a Cow's Horn with apertures (without any mention of a bag) matches with Swedish cowhorns. In Sweden these instruments were also called "vallhorn" ("vall" from "vallning", which means herding in Swedish) and possibly "vallpipa", as in older poetic Swedish "pipa" could be used for any pipe-shaped wooden wind instrument. It is therefore possible that "Walpipe" does not refer to a bagpipe but to a cowhorn, and that Barrington or Fougt only referred to the Sakpipe being the same as other bagpipes.
