= Electric bagpipes =

Bagpipes with pickups

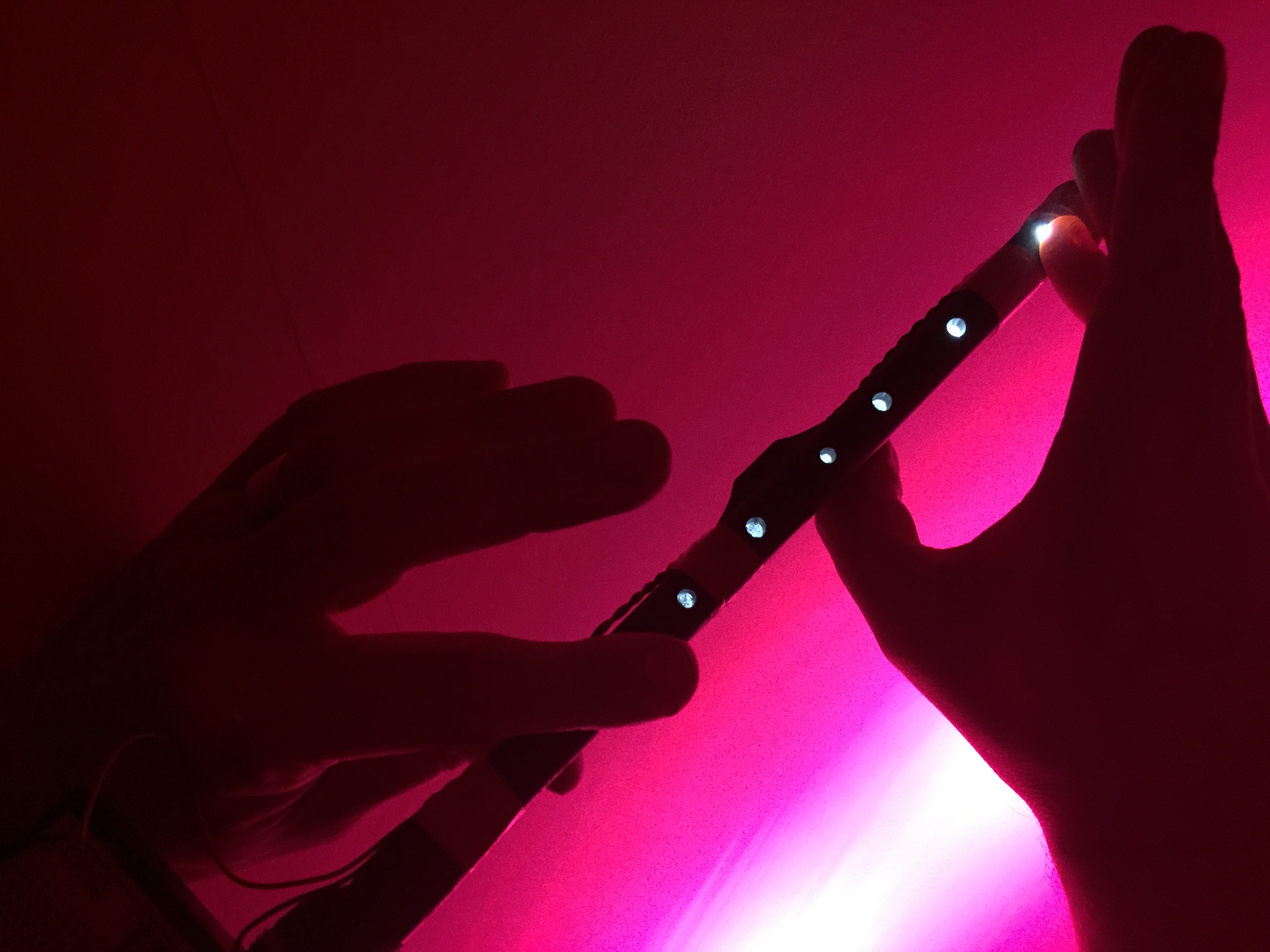
An optical electric bagpipe chanter being played.

Electric or electro-acoustic bagpipes refers to any set of bagpipes designed to use a pickup to detect the mechanical vibrations of the reed or reeds. As with an electric guitar, the detected electrical signal is then routed to an amplifier, and from there to a loudspeaker. Depending on the volume of the amplified sound, the acoustic sound of the bagpipe will also be heard to some extent alongside it.

The pickup used in bagpipes can be of either a magnetic or an optical type.

As with electric guitar, the output of an electric bagpipe is suitable for routing through effects units.

In comparison to the more common electronic bagpipes, which are sensor-based electronic devices designed to imitate the experience of playing bagpipes, the electric bagpipes are a rare, experimental instrument. No commercial instruments are currently known to be in production.

== History ==
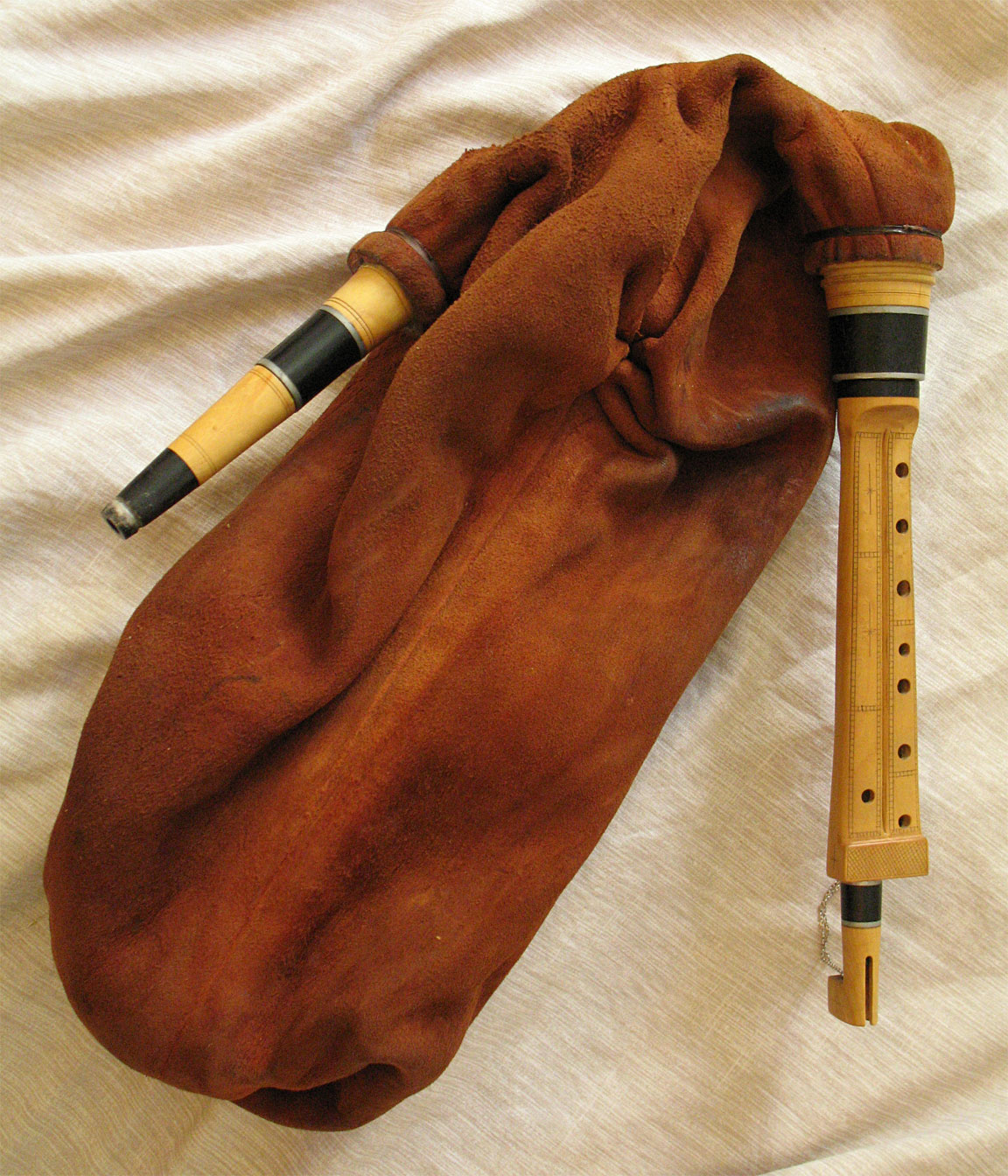
The Boha - French musician Yan Cozian has had success in creating an electro-acoustic version of the Boha.

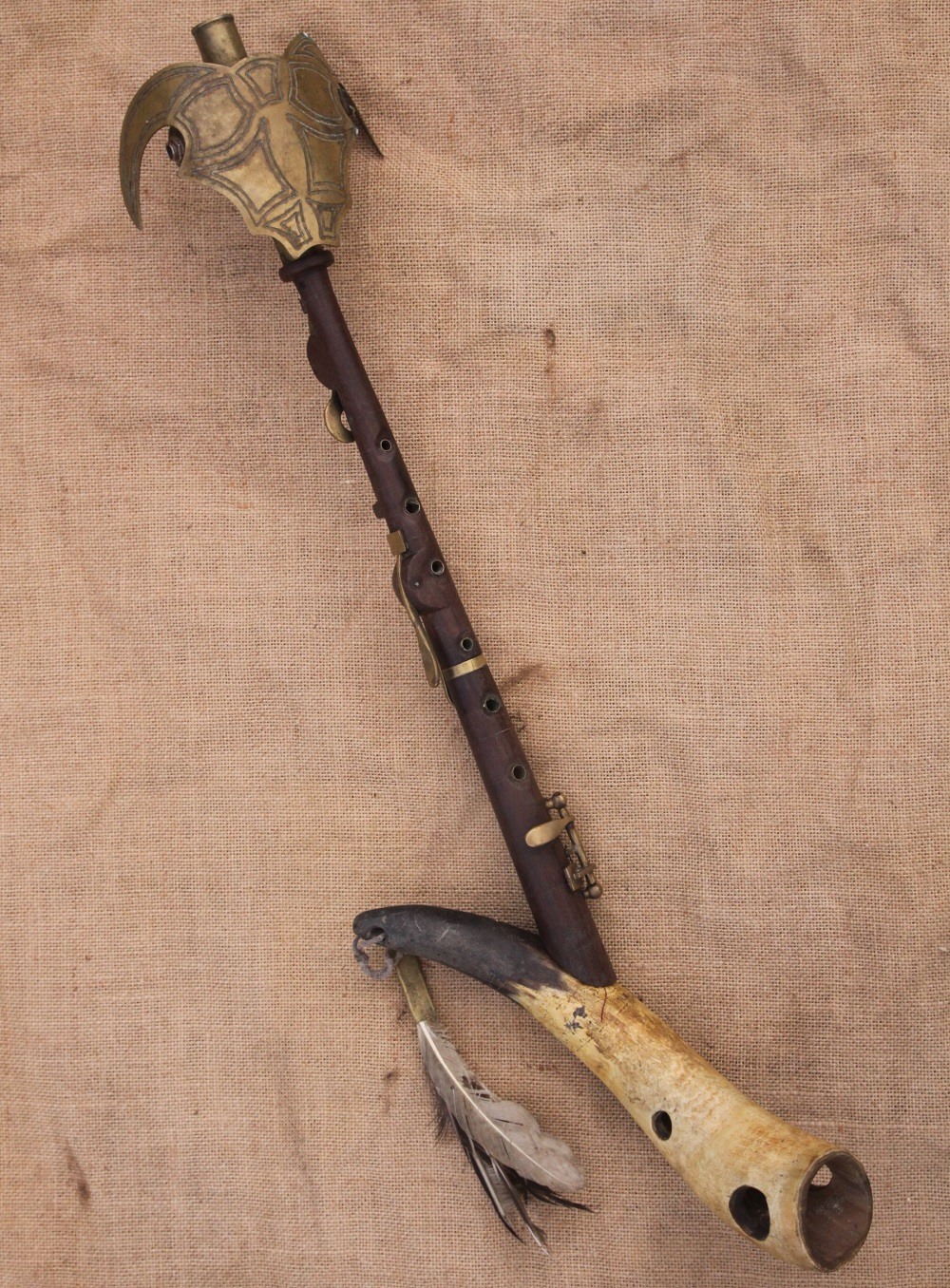
Eryri bagpipe chanter

An instrument titled "The Eryri Bagpipes", which apparently used a magnetic coil pickup in conjunction with a specially design steel reed, appears to have been constructed by the year 2001, by Welsh piper Paddy Whetman. These pipes featured on Whetman's "Goat Industries" site from at least 2001-2006, according to logs on the Wayback Machine. The maker also appears to have made a number of recordings featuring them, some of which can still be found on YouTube. In 2016, a video was uploaded to YouTube by Goat Industries, giving basic information about the instrument, closeup images, and an audio recording.

French musician Yan Cozian has demonstrated an electro-acoustic Boha in a video dated 11 May 2014. This instrument appears to use piezoelectric sensors, to collect the oscillations of the reeds directly.

The possibility of using optical pickup technology, to allow any standard cane-reeded bagpipe to be made "electric", was raised in August 2016 by Scottish Smallpipes player Donald WG Lindsay. This led to articles in UK & Scottish dailies, including a short video demonstrating a prototype instrument of this type.

== Pickup types suitable for bagpipes ==
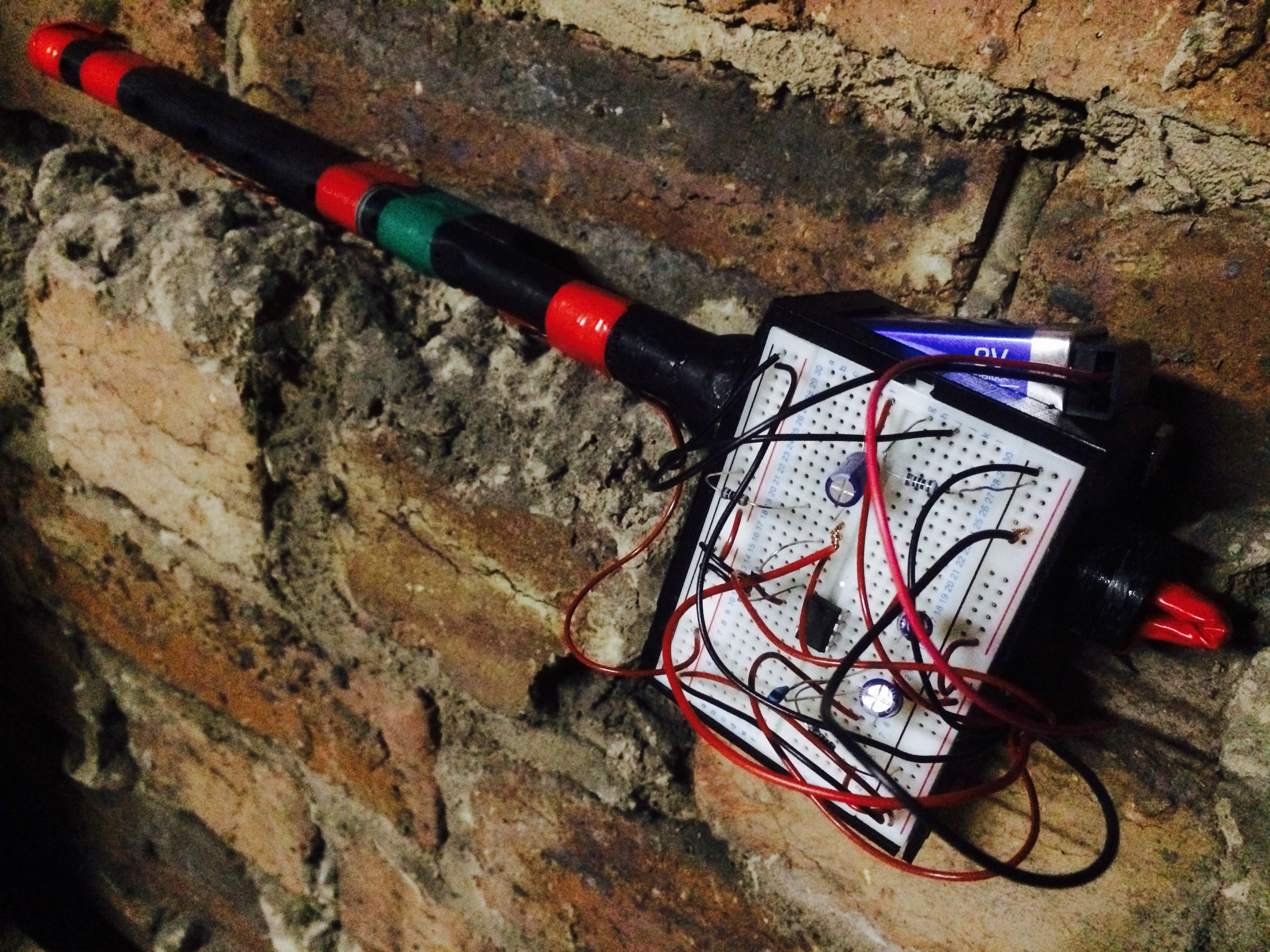
A chanter, from a set of Scottish Smallpipes, fitted with a home made optical pickup and amplifier circuit.

=== Magnetic pickup ===
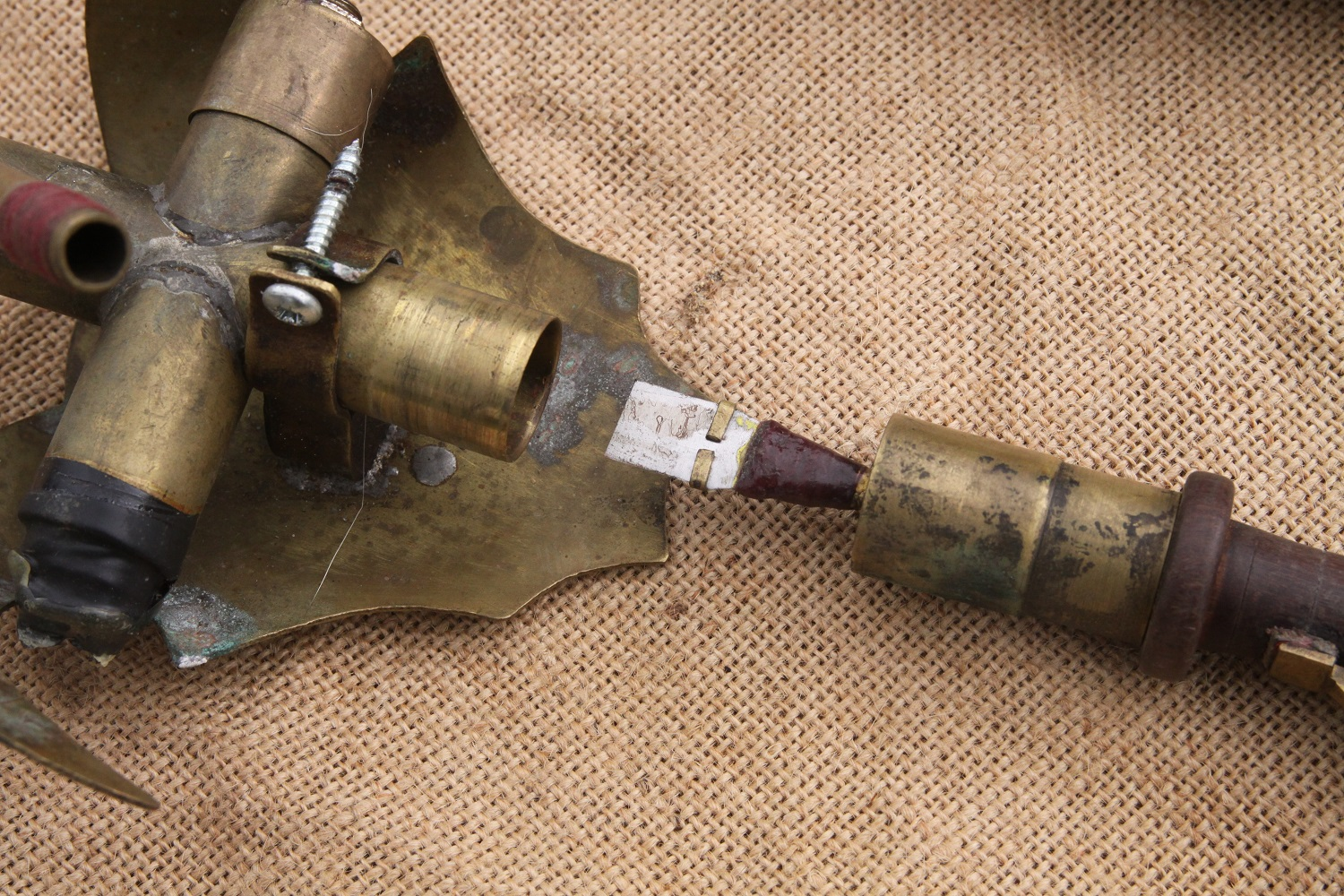
Eryri bagpipes carbon steel reed

To use a magnetic coil pickup, the bagpipe needs to be equipped with a reed or reeds made from a ferrous metal. As with a magnetic guitar pickup, the magnet in the pickup creates a magnetic field, which is then disturbed by the oscillation (in this case of the metal reed, rather than the string), inducing a voltage in the coil. This voltage signal would then be directed to an amplifier, and on to a loudspeaker from which the amplified "electric" sound of the bagpipe can thus be heard. The main advantage of using this pickup is that the acoustic feedback can be controlled, even in a very noisy environment i.e. full drum kit.

=== Piezo pickup ===
In the case of some single reed bagpipes, a piezo pickup may be attached directly to the reed. Depending on the bagpipe & reed, this may affect the oscillation of the reed to some extent. It does offer a way to pick up the reed's vibrations directly however, and can be used as the basis of an electric or electro-acoustic bagpipe.

=== Optical pickup ===
In an optical bagpipe pickup, light is passed directly through the reed while playing, and collected by a receiver, in the form of a photodiode or phototransistor. The output from the receiver is then fed to an amplifier, which may be built into the instrument or separate from it, and on to a loudspeaker from which the amplified sound can be heard.

== See also ==
- Electronic bagpipes - digital or MIDI instrument
- Digital accordion - bellows-driven electronic instrument
