= Zummarah-bi-soan =

The zummárah-bi-soan (or sumara-el-kurbe) is a type of small Egyptian double-chantered bagpipe made from a goatskin. An 1871 Western source noted that it is "sometimes, but rarely, seen in Egypt." The South Kensington museum also noted the term zouggarah as an Egyptian Arabic term for a bagpipe.
