= Shapar =

Bagpipes from Russia

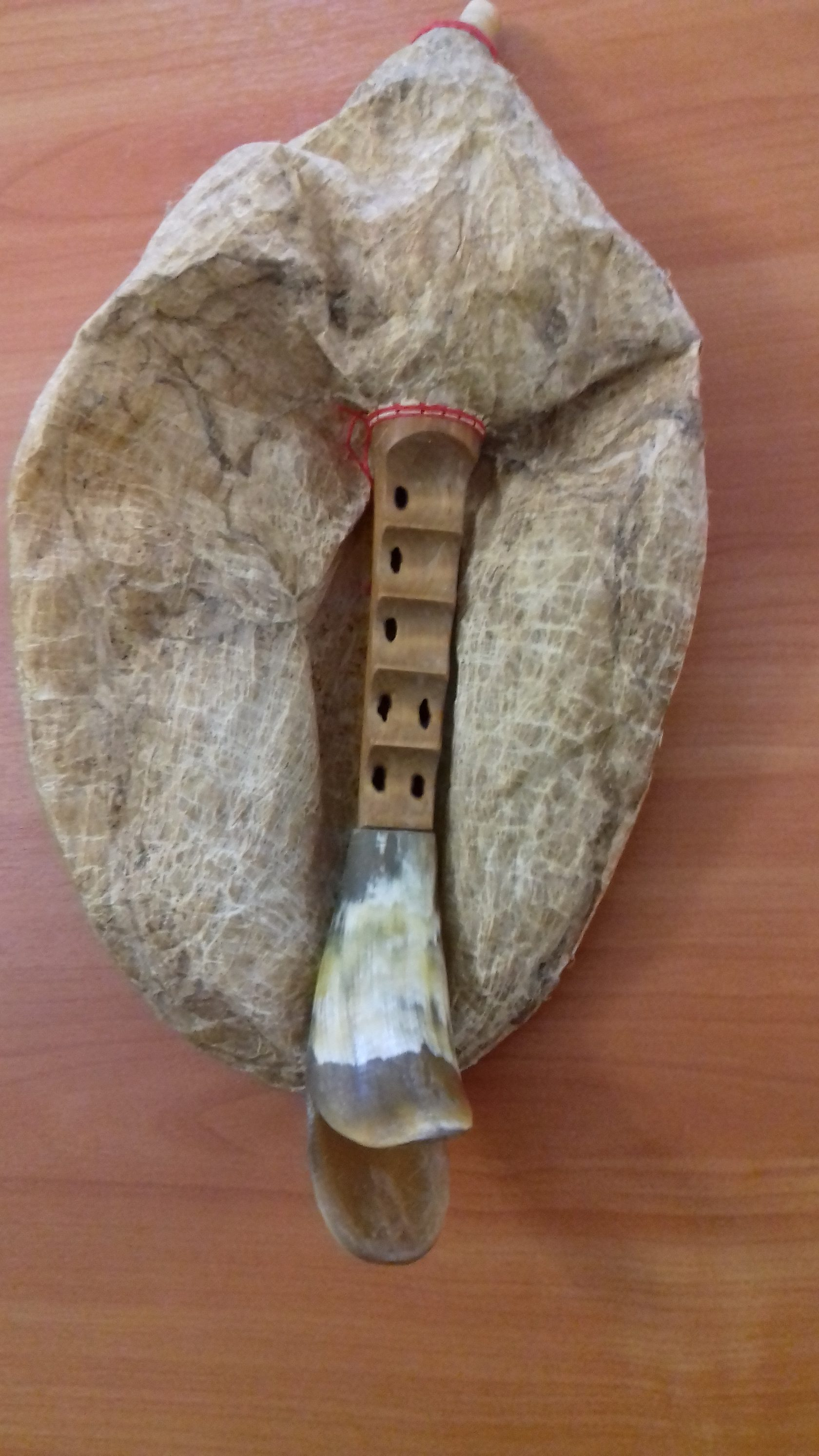
- Classification: Aerophone Bagpipe

Related instruments
- Shuvyr (Mari ethnic group)

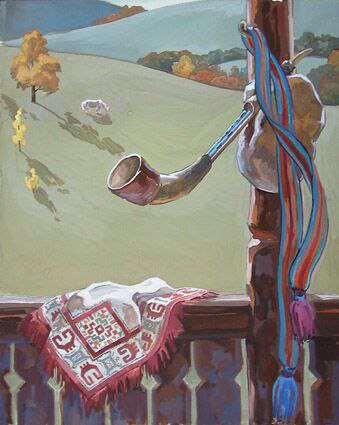
Painting of a Shapar by honored artist of the Chuvash Autonomous Soviet Socialist Republic Efeykina Adel Akimovna (1933-1999).

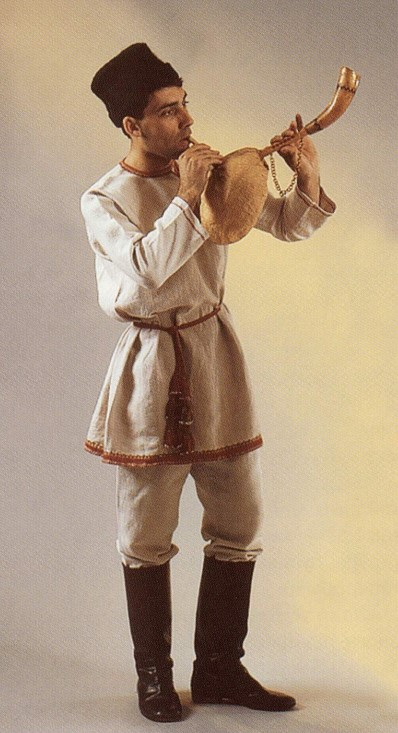
A man playing the Shapar in traditional Chuvash clothing.

The shapar (shabr, Russian: Шапар, шабр, шыбыр, пузырь) is a type of bagpipe of the Chuvash people of the Volga Region of Russia. The bag is usually made of a bladder; the pipe has a double-chanter bored into a single block of wood. The pipes were, until recently, played for weddings.
