= Zetland pipes =

Bagpipe

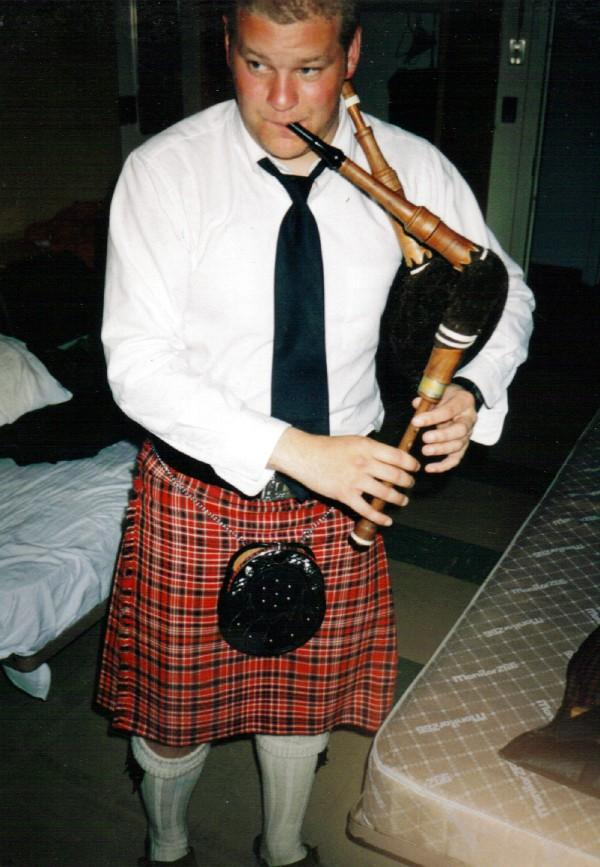
First wood Zetland pipes

The Zetland pipes were a type of bagpipe designed and crafted by Pipe Major Royce Lerwick in the 1990s.

== Historical impetus ==
Lerwick believed that the bagpipes had been introduced to the British Isles by the Vikings. His "Zetland pipes" were intended to resemble single-drone, single-reeded pipes such as might have been brought to the Shetland Islands by the Vikings. The term "Zetland" is an antiquated variant of "Shetland".

The original impetus for the design, according to Lerwick, was the Lady Maket pipes, or Silver Pipes of Ur. This was an archaeological find, resembling bagpipes, dating back to 2500 BCE.

== Practical impetus ==
Lerwick's Zetland pipes were also intended to be a type of smallpipe that would be easy to learn and maintain, and applicable to popular folk and Celtic music. The handbook supplied with the pipes offered options for adapting different types of open or closed fingerings for the pipe, for maximum versatility, and also methods to change the modal scale of the pipe for playing different types of music.

== Design ==
The pipes consisted of a mouth-blown blowpipe, a single bass drone, and a single-reeded chanter in the key of D. This key was chosen as it was ideally suited for much of the Celtic repertoire. The single-reed gave the chanter a mellow sound, akin to the Swedish sackpipa.

== Marketing ==
The Zetland pipes were sold online, offered in either "American green ebony" or striped ebony. Natural drone reeds were included, with synthetic Highland drone reeds an option for both drone and chanter. Lerwick ceased production of the pipes around the year 2000.
