= Huemmelchen =

Small German bagpipe

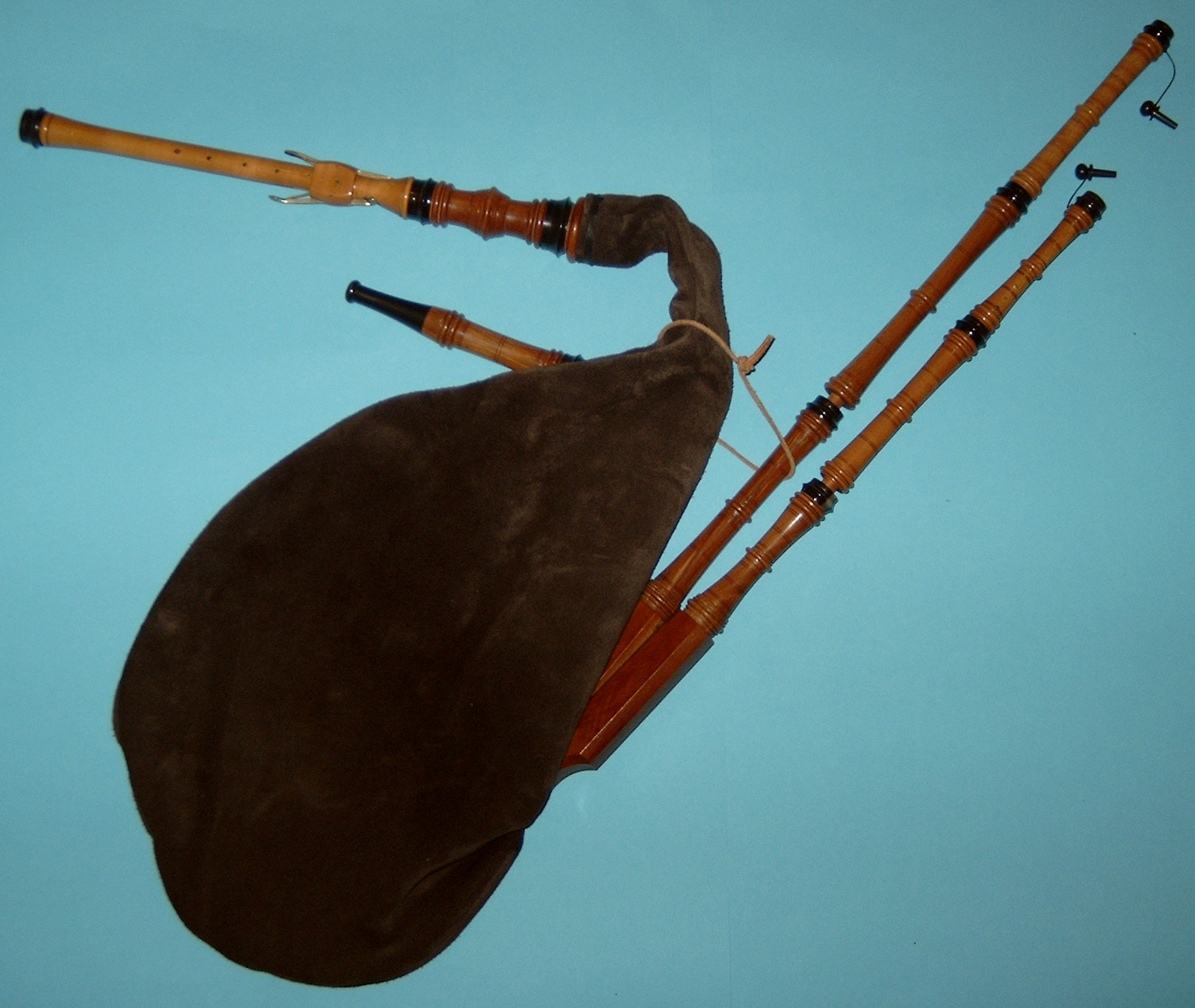
Modern hümmelchen

The hümmelchen is a type of small German bagpipe, attested in Syntagma Musicum by Michael Praetorius during the Renaissance.

Early versions are believed to have double-reeded chanters, most likely with single-reeded drones.

The word "hümmelchen" probably comes from the Low German word hämeln meaning "trim". This may refer to the hümmelchen's small size, resembling a trimmed-down version of a larger bagpipe. Another possibly etymology comes from the word hummel ("bumblebee"), referring to the buzzing sound of the drone. The term hummel is still used to refer to a type of droning zither in Germanic countries.
