= Sarva (music) =

Sarva music genre

Sarva is a musical genre found in the Bushehr region of Iran. It consists of the singing of free-metre couplets, often accompanied by the Iranian bagpipe, the ney anban.
