= Surdelina =

Type of bagpipe instrument

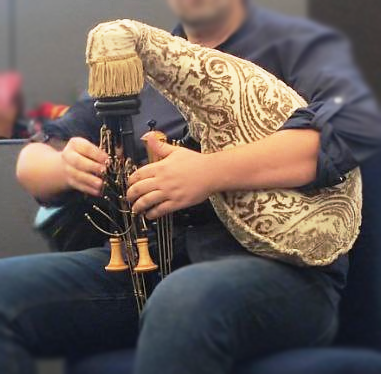

The surdelina, sourdeline or sampogna was a kind of bagpipe which was described and illustrated by Mersenne as the musette de Naples or musette de Italie its construction was very complicated. Mersenne states that the instrument was invented by Jean Baptiste Riva (who was living in Paris in 1620), Dom Julio and Vincenze; but Mersenne seems to have made alterations himself in the original instrument, which are not very clearly explained. There were two chanters with narrow cylindrical bore and having both finger-holes and keys; and two drones each having ten keys. The four pipes were fixed in the same stock, and double reeds were used throughout; the bag was inflated by means of bellows.

Passenti of Venice published a collection of melodies for the zampogna in 1628, under the title of Canora Zampogna.

In the 17th century, it was also played in France.

== Modern revival ==
The bagpipe, being a complex instrument based on folk origins, eventually went into disuse. Recent extensive research had been made as to the origins of its developments and by 2019 work was performed to recreate the complex instruments as depicted in paintings of the era.
