= Puvama =

Mordovian bagpipe

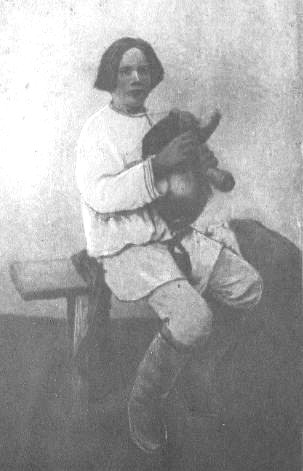
Musician with puvama

The puvama (Erzya language: пувама, Moksha language: фам, уфам, ufam, or palama) is a type of bagpipe of the Mordvin people of Mordovia, in the eastern part of the East European Plain of Russia.
