= Boha =

French bagpipe

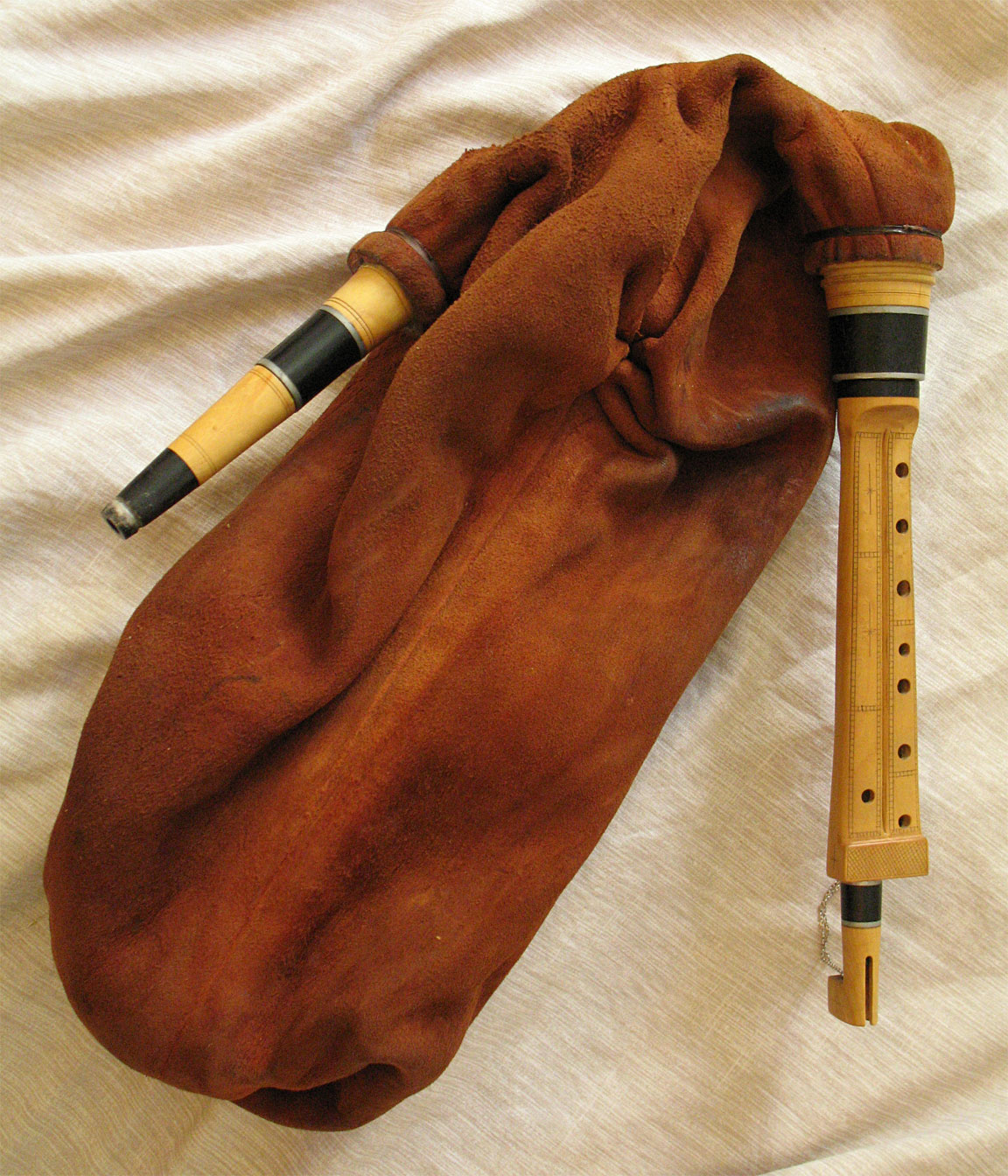
Boha made in 2003

The boha (also known as the Cornemuse Landaise or bohaossac) is a type of bagpipe native to the Landes of Gascony in southwestern France.

This bagpipe is notable in that it bears a greater resemblance to Eastern European bagpipes, particularly the contra-chanter bagpipes of the Pannonian Plain (e.g., the Hungarian duda), than to other Western European pipes. It features both a chanter and a drone bored into a common rectangular body. Both chanter and drone use single reeds.

== Bibliography ==
- Sur le site des Bohaires de Gasconha
- Sur le site de Big Boha Band
- Sur le site de Rock'n'Trad
