= Karkm =

The karkm is a type of bagpipe played by the "Turkmen" nomads of Turkey (presumably those now known as Yörük), at least in the late 18th and early 19th century. The name is believed derived from the word for "lance reed", a material also used to make bagpipes in Hatay (modern Turkey). The scholar Yalgin noted that the Turkmen believe it was they who introduced the bagpipe to the Arabs.
