= Caramusa =

The caramusa is a type of bagpipe played in Corsica. It consists of a chanter and a parallel drone.

The instrument is associated with shepherds, and also was traditionally played at festivals.
