= Schweizer Sackpfeife =

Type of Bagpipe in Switzerland

The Schweizer Sackpfeife is a type of bagpipe played in Switzerland from the Middle Ages until around 1700. In German-speaking Switzerland, the pipes are known as "sackpfiff", "sackpfyf", "sagkphiffen", or "sackphiffen". In French-speaking Switzerland it is known as the musette, "cornamusa", or "cornamuse". In the Italian-speaking areas it as known as "zampogna", "piva", "musetto" or "corna musa". In the Romansch language it is called "tudelsac".

An 1884 text noted that the effect of the Swiss bagpipe upon Swiss mercenaries was so pronounced that the instrument had to be banned. The instrument was said to have provoked a deep nostalgia among the Swiss listeners when it was taken up, and plunged them into melancholy when they realised they might never return home.
