= Viniegra de Arriba =

- Municipality
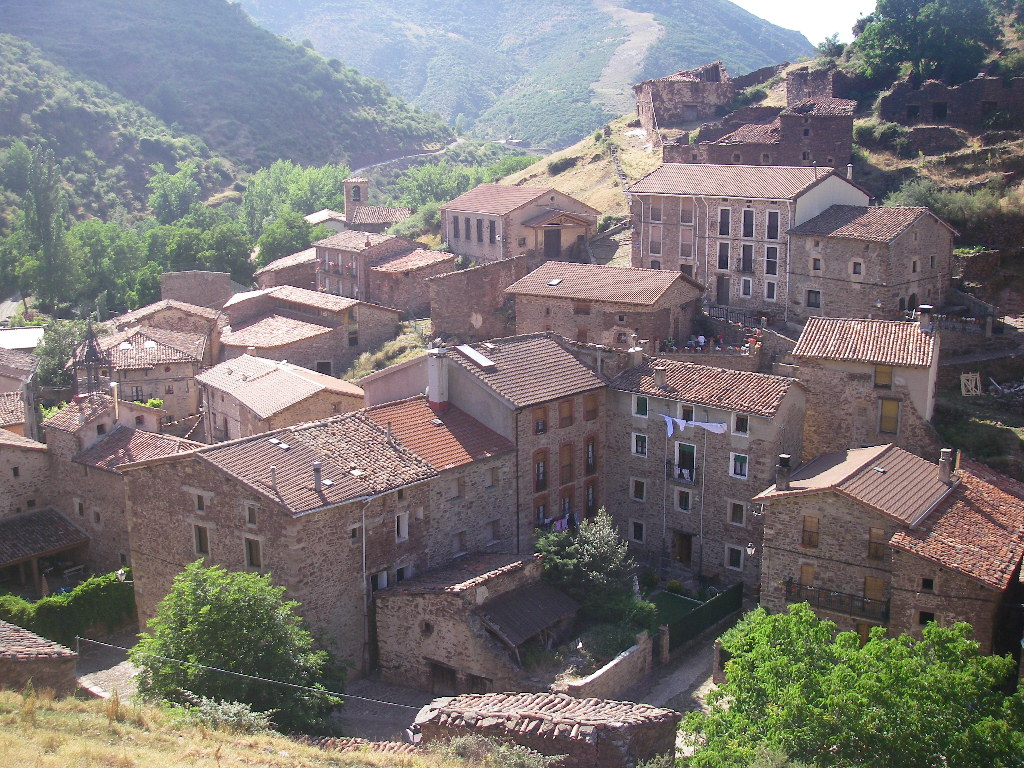
- Skyline of Viniegra de Arriba

- Location within La Rioja, Spain Location within Spain
- Coordinates: 42°05′43″N 2°50′03″W
- Country: Spain
- Autonomous community: La Rioja
- Comarca: Anguiano

Government
  - Mayor: Laura Crespí Lázaro (PP)

Area
  - Total: 38.46 km^{2} (14.85 sq mi)
- Elevation: 1,181 m (3,875 ft)

Population (2025-01-01)
  - Total: 40
- Demonym(s): noguerón, na
- Postal code: 26325
- Website: www.viniegradearriba.org

Viniegra de Arriba is a village in the province and autonomous community of La Rioja, Spain. The municipality covers an area of 38.46 square kilometres (14.85 sq mi) and as of 2011 had a population of 50 people.
