= Istarski mih =

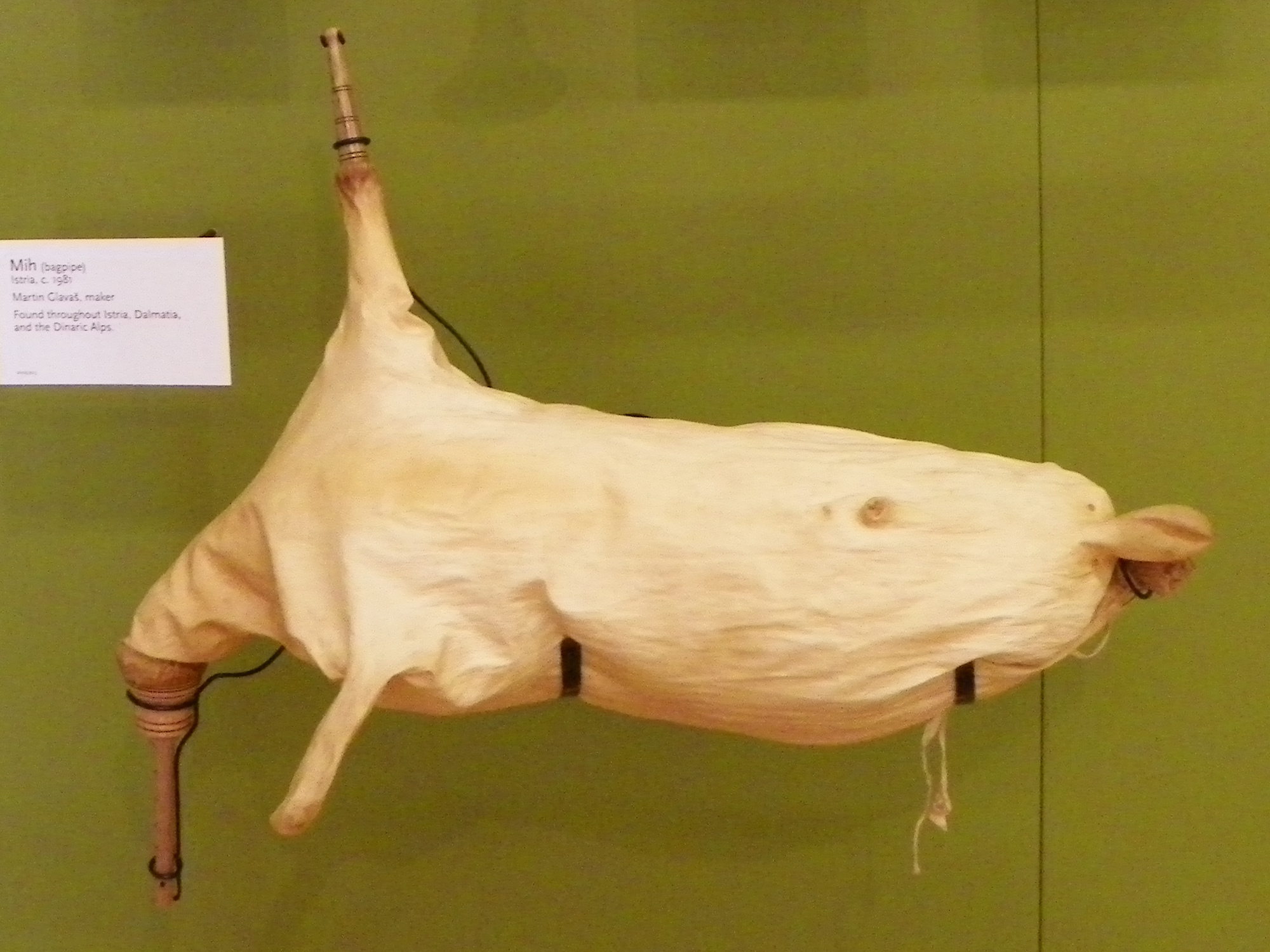
A mih, in the Phoenix Musical Instrument Museum.

The Istarski mih or Istrian mih is a bagpipe native to the regions of Istria and Kvarner, Croatia.

It consists of a bag made most often from goat skin and a double-chanter with two single reeds. This type of bagpipe is distinct in that it has no drones, but a double-chanter with finger-holes on both bores, allowing both a melody and changing harmony to be played. In this respect the mih more resembles the bagpipes of the Southwest Asia and North Africa than other European bagpipes. The instrument is not dodecaphonically tempered, it is a solistic instrument and it corresponds to the so-called Istrian scale. Due to its specific tone-hole placement, its sound is distinct and unusual even when compared to other instruments of the same "mih" family.

Unlike other Croatian bagpipe-like instruments that were forgotten and replaced with the accordion and violin in the 20th century, the art of playing istarski mih has not faced such rapid cultural decay. Ivan Matetić Ronjgov, a native Istrian composer, is credited with having revived the art of playing the istarski mih and the shawm-like instrument sopile in the 20th century. Nowadays, these instruments can be frequently seen and heard on many traditional music manifestations across Istria, with many young and perspective players performing and learning to play. Till the end of the second world war, the instrument was present also in the northern part of Ćićarija region, in Slovenia, but the tradition there hasn't been revived since. There are also some players and makers outside Istria, like Stjepan Večković, that contribute to the continuation of the instrument's tradition into the 21st century.

== See also ==
- Diple
