= Swedish cowhorn =

Musical instrument

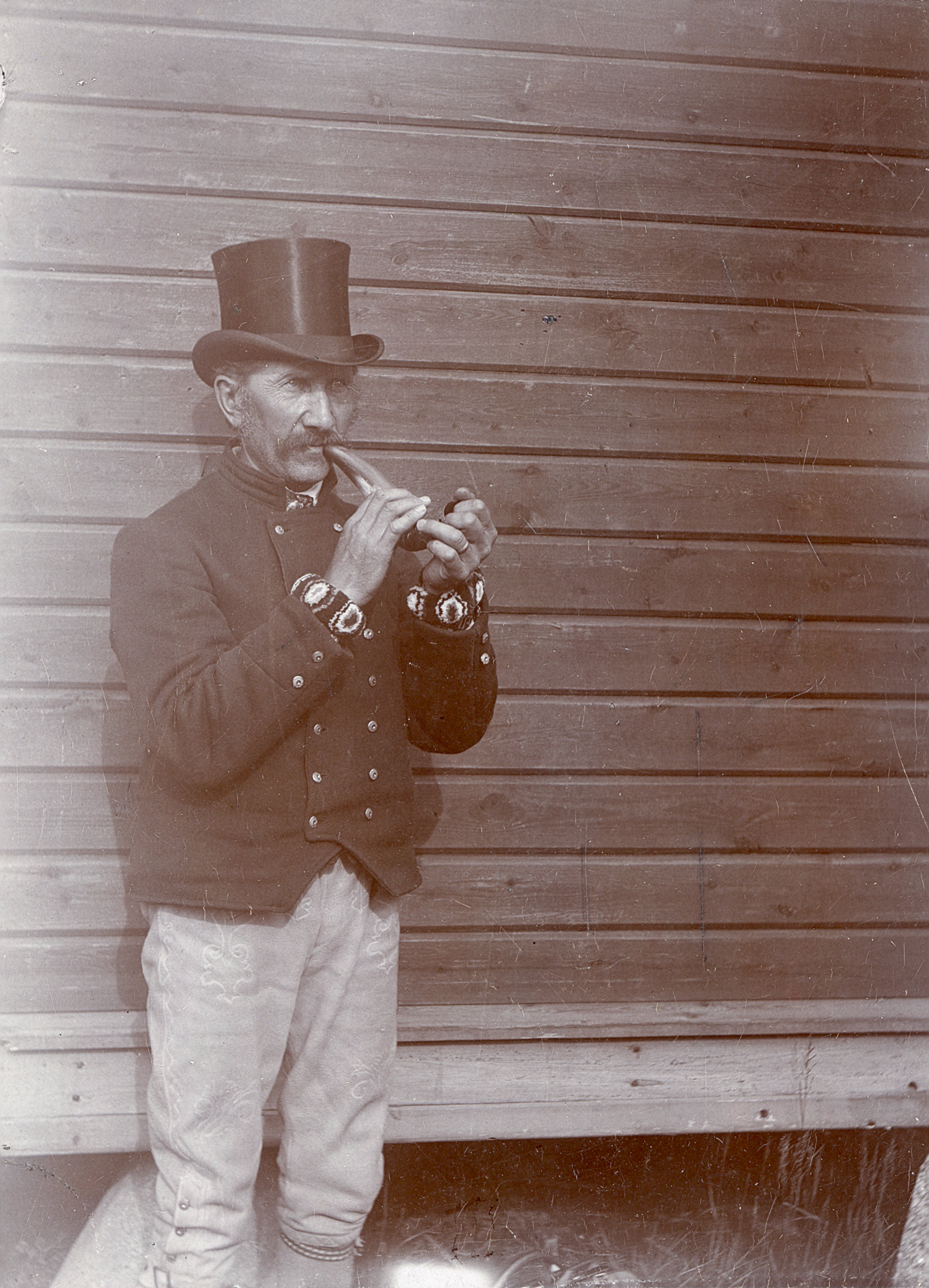
Nörstmo Halvar Halvarson, Malung, playing the cowhorn

The Swedish cowhorn (Swedish: kohorn) is a primitive musical instrument constructed from the natural horn of livestock. The instrument has no separate mouthpiece and is blown similarly to a trumpet but with much greater force. There are two types of traditional cowhorns: one without finger holes for scaring off bears and wolves while herding livestock in the forest ("tuthorn") and one with three or four finger holes for calling the domestic animals or other people ("vallhorn"). The cowhorn was used in the Swedish transhumance or fäbodkultur, an ancient system of moving the cattle to remote summer pastures, thus making more efficient use of scarce resources. This was mostly women's work, which is why women excelled at cowhorn playing. Different melodies carried different meanings such as "one of my cows is missing" or "stop looking, your cow is here". Cows, sheep and goats would have each their own melody which made them come back from their foraging. Cowhorns were also played for entertainment, for dancing or for devotions. A testimony of its long-standing tradition, the oldest extant Swedish cowhorn with finger holes dates to the 6th century.

In contemporary music, cowhorns have been used by musicians such as Swedish trumpeter Håkan Hardenberger.

== See also ==
- Bukkehorn
