= Diple =

Woodwind musical instrument

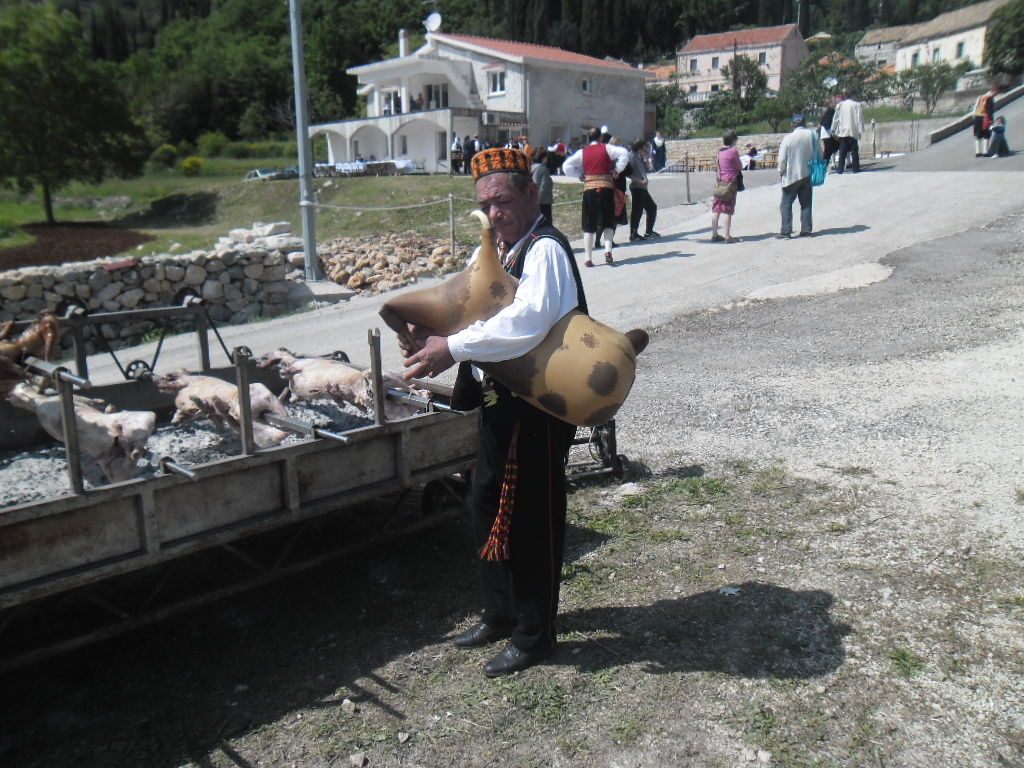
- Classification: Bagpiping

Related instruments
- Bock (Czech); Cimpoi (Romanian); Duda (Hungarian/Polish); Koza (Polish); Gaida (South Eastern Europe) (the Balkans); Tulum (Turkish and Pontic); Tsambouna (Dodecanese and Cyclades); Askomandoura (Crete); Gajdy (Polish/Czech/Slovak); Gaita (Galician); Surle (Croatian); Mezoued/Zukra (Northern Africa); Guda, tulum (Laz people); Dankiyo, zimpona (Pontic); Parakapzuk (Armenia); Gudastviri (Georgia); Tsimboni (Georgia) (Adjara); Shuvyr (Circassians); Sahbr, Shapar (Chuvashia); Tulug (Azerbaijan); Volynka (Ukrainian: Волинка), (Russian: Волынка) (Ukraine, Russia)

Diple (pluralia tantum; pronounced [dîple̞], from Greek δῐπλόος lit. 'double, two-fold'), also known as misnjiče, miješnice and mih, is a traditional woodwind musical instrument originating in the Adriatic Littoral. It is played in Bosnia and Herzegovina, Croatia, Slovenia, Montenegro, and Serbia.

== The flute ==
The diple are a reedpipe instrument that incorporates two bores within one body, and thus creates two notes simultaneously. Generally, the left hand fingers a group of holes on the left side of the body, and the right on its side.

== Droneless bagpipes ==
All bagpipe diple have a double chanter with two separate single reeds, which originated in the coastal areas of Dalmatia, Bosnia and Herzegovina, and Montenegro with various difference. The bag of the bagpipes is called a mih/mêh/mijeh/mješina, which consists of a tanned goat skin, the blowpipe is a dulac or gajdenica, through which the air is blown, which is in fact a double chanter used to play the melody and harmony simultaneously. The chanter incorporates two single reeds, one in each bore. The mijeh or diple is played from Istria in the north, down through Lika, Dalmatia, Bosnia and Herzegovina, and ending in Montenegro.

Unlike the majority of European bagpipes, the meh has no drone (trubanj, prdalo, prdaljka), instead playing both a melody and harmony part on the chanter. Though their general form is similar, the meh in different parts of Bosnia varies in chanter tunings, ornamentation, and other small factors. The meh is an untempered instrument, and its specific intonation varies by region.
