= Duda (bagpipe) =

Traditional bagpipe of Hungary

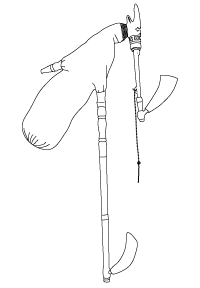
- Other names: bőrduda, tömlősíp
- Classification: Bagpiping

Related instruments
- Bock (Czech); Cimpoi (Romanian); Gaida (South Eastern Europe) (the Balkans); Koza (Ukrainian: Коза) (Polish, Ukrainian Carpathians); Diple (Dalmatian Coast); Tulum (Turkish and Pontic); Tsambouna (Dodecanese and Cyclades); Askambandoura (Crete); Gajdy (Polish/Czech/Slovak); Gaita (Galician); Surle (Serbian/Croatian); Mezoued/Zukra (Northern Africa); Guda, tulum (Laz people); Dankiyo, zimpona (Pontic); Parakapzuk (Armenia); Gudastviri (Georgia (country)); Tsimboni (Georgia (country) )(Adjara); Shuvyr (Circassians ); Sahbr, Shapar (Chuvashia); Tulug (Azerbaijan); Volynka (Ukrainian: Волинка), (Russian: Волынка) (Ukraine, Russia)

The Hungarian duda (also known as tömlősíp and bőrduda) is the traditional bagpipe of Hungary. It is an example of a group of bagpipes called Medio-Carparthian bagpipes.

Accounts are conflicting regarding the exact form of the Hungarian bagpipe. Cocks describes it as similar to the Bulgarian one which has a chanter and a bass drone but no tenor drone. Baines (pp. 77–79) gives Hungary as one of the countries possessing the duda, which has this construction, also a Hungarian bagpipe with a diple (i.e., twin-bore) chanter, one bore of which gives a variable drone, the bag pipe having a bass drone in addition. Robert Bright in Travels through Lower Hungary(1818), quoted by Flood (p. 79), describes the Hungarian bagpipe as having two drones and a chanter of square section (in other worlds the Dudelsack). Fraser (p. 243) has a picture of a Hungarian bagpipe with one chanter and one drone of medium length, probably a bass drone. It seems possible that all these forms of the instrument may be in use.

== Features ==
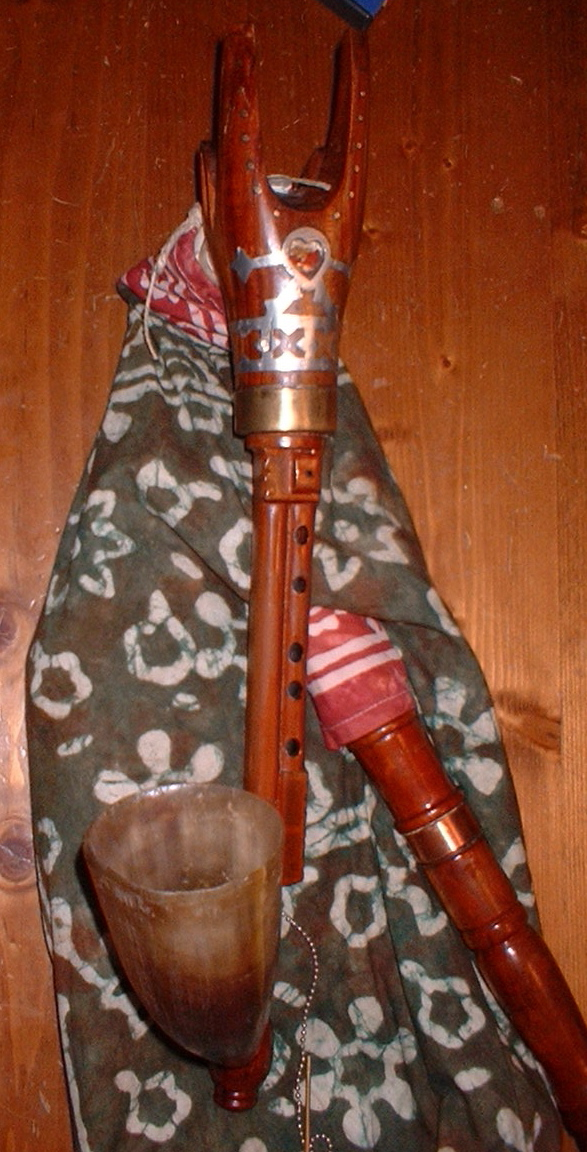
The chanter of a magyar duda. Note the double chanter and the carved animal head stock. The single finger hole of the kontra pipe is hidden behind the cow-horn chanter bell

The most characteristic feature of the magyar duda is the double-bored chanter. One chanter bore, the dallamsíp ("melody pipe"), plays the melody within an octave range. The second chanter, the kontrasíp or kontra ("contra pipe") has a single finger hole and sounds either the lowest note on the melody pipe or drops to the dominant (i.e., on a pipe in A it sounds either A or E).

Hungarian piping is characterized by use of the kontra to provide rhythmic accompaniment and to vary the drone sound. The melody pipe has a "flea hole", a common feature in Eastern bagpipes: the top hole on the chanter is very small and uncovering it raises the pitch of any other note by approximately a semitone, making the Hungarian pipe largely chromatic over its range (it lacks a major seventh). In some historic examples, the magyar duda was tuned with a neutral (i.e., between the major and the minor in pitch) third and sixth and the flea hole was filled in with wax.

There is considerable variation in physical appearance of the duda in Hungary, but the most common form has a chanter stock in the form of an animal’s head (usually that of a goat-like animal) and a cow horn bell on both the kontra and the drone. Historically the bag was often made from dog skin (leading to a popular song that stated that prospective bagpipers needed to “go to hell because that’s where the big dogs are from which good bagpipes can be made”), but today goat skin is a much more common material.

== Other variations ==
Other variations of the duda, especially those played along the Slovak and Croatian borders, have as many as four chanter pipes. In these examples one hand plays the dominant through the octave on one pipe while the other hand plays the tonic through the subdominant on another (in this case the tonic through the subdominant have no chromatic possibilities except through half-holing since the flea hole is on a separate pipe). If a fourth pipe is added it is a stopped pipe with a thumb hole that sounds the octave when uncovered. (These pipes show the influence of Croatian and Slovak pipes, both of which commonly have up to four separate chanter bores.)

== Hungarian bagpiping ==
Hungarian bagpiping is characterized in its styling by hiccupping, use of high notes to articulate lower notes, creating a characteristic rhythmic squeaking while the instrument is played. This playing style greatly influenced certain genres of fiddle music in Hungary, and also characterized early church organ music in Hungary: prior to the introduction of organs, the duda had been used to accompany hymnody in churches.

== History ==
Up until the 1920s the duda was the preferred instrument at celebrations in much of Hungary. As the Hungarian economy improved and the pastoral lifestyle declined in importance, the lone piper at a country ball or wedding was increasingly replaced by professional Gypsy bands (cigányzenekar) that played an urban repertoire on more complex and capable instruments. The Hungarian bagpipe was essentially extinct except in small pockets by the 1950s but was “rescued” as part of the Hungarian folk revival, and is today a very popular instrument among Hungarian folk bands and their fans.

Béla Bartók's composition "Bagpipe," from Volume 5 of Mikrokosmos, is a piano piece that imitates the sound of the duda.

=== Duda folklore ===
As was the case in much of Europe, bagpipes in Hungary were associated with shepherds and a pastoral lifestyle, and were often used in Christmas scenes to evoke the shepherds of the nativity. At the same time the duda was associated with the pagan lifestyle of the countryside. Aside from the above-mentioned song about bagpipers needing to go to hell, according to János Manga’s article ‘Hungarian Bagpipers’ (Acta ethnographica Academiæ Scientiarum Hungaricæ xiv(1–2):1–97) there were many legends about bagpipes that could play themselves when hung from the wall on a nail or about pipers summoned to Witches' Sabbaths to perform for satanic hosts. Despite these stories, the duda never received the same sort of official censure in Catholic Hungary that bagpipes did in many Protestant nations.

=== Recordings ===
There are a number of recordings of the magyar duda, including CDs from the groups Téka and Muzsikás, the soloist Balázs Istvánfi, and the Magyar Dudazenekar

== See also ==
- Bock (bagpipe) (dudy)
