= Chanter =

Part of the bagpipes

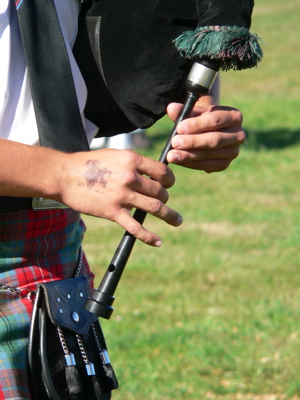
The chanter of the Great Highland bagpipe.

The chanter (Irish: seamsúr; Scottish Gaelic: seannsair; Scots: chanter, chaunter) is the part of the bagpipe upon which the player creates the melody. It consists of a number of finger-holes, and in its simpler forms looks similar to a recorder. On more elaborate bagpipes, such as the Northumbrian bagpipes or the Uilleann pipes, it also may have a number of keys, to increase the instrument's range and/or the number of keys (in the modal sense) it can play in. Like the rest of the bagpipe, they are often decorated with a variety of substances, including metal (silver/nickel/gold/brass), bone, ivory, or plastic mountings.

== Cylindrical vs. conical bore ==
Chanters come in two main types, parallel and non-parallel bored (although there is no clear dividing line between the two). This refers to the shape of the internal bore of the chanter. On the Great Highland Bagpipe, the internal bore is conical: it is this that gives the chanter its exceptional volume. The Northumbrian pipes, on the other hand, have a parallel bore, giving them a much sweeter and quieter tone.

== Keyed chanter ==
Although the majority of chanters are unkeyed, some make extensive use of keys to extend the range and/or the number of accidentals the chanter can play. The most common pipe featuring this arrangement is the Northumbrian smallpipe.

== Double chanter ==
Another variant of the chanter is the two-piped chanter (often called a double chanter). The chanter pipes may be designed to be played separately, one with each hand, or the two chanters may be played in unison (as in most Arabic bagpipes). One chanter may provide a drone accompaniment to the other, or the two chanters may play in a harmony of thirds and sixths (as in the northern Italian Müsa and central-southern Italian zampogna). In pipes of the Carpathian basin up to five separate chanter bores may be placed in parallel within a single chanter assembly, providing both melodic and rhythmic possibilities: in the simplest case, one pipe is used to play the melody while the second provides a variable drone, while more complex pipes may separate certain individual notes into separate, stopped pipes.

== Intonation ==
Because of the accompanying drone or drones, the lack of modulation in bagpipe melody, and stable timbre of the reed sound, in many bagpipe traditions the tones of the chanter are tuned using just intonation, although bagpipe tuning is highly variable across traditions. On the Great Highland bagpipe, tuning of the individual notes of the chanter is done using tape to slightly cover the finger holes as needed. Historically, it was done with wax, as was done with other woodwind instruments.

== Practice chanter ==
The practice chanter is used as a practice instrument for the Great Highland Bagpipe. It is somewhat similar in appearance, though slightly smaller than the bagpipe chanter, and has a top piece before the reed so it can be blown directly from the mouth. It is also used as a first instrument so that learners can initially learn the finger technique before learning the mechanics of controlling the bag. It is almost exclusively made of hardwood or plastic.

The practice chanter of today may also be a descendant of the hornpipe or "stock-and-horn", a historical reed pipe of Scotland with a capped double reed and bell made of horn, played by shepherds, among others.
