= Irish road bowling =

Sport played with metal balls in some parts of Ireland

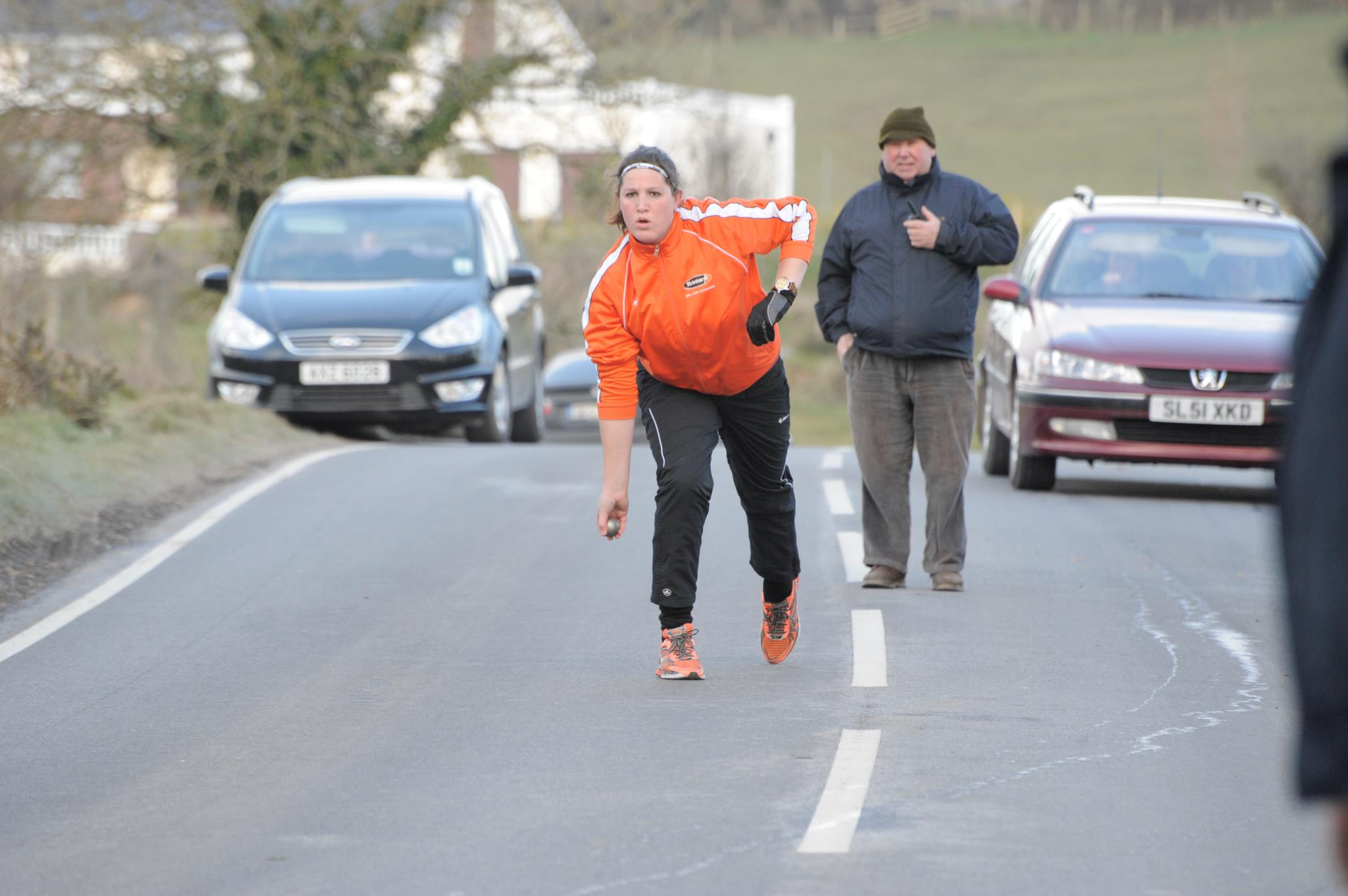
- Dutch competitor Silke Tulk bowling in Northern Ireland

Characteristics
- Equipment: cannonball of c.18 centimetres (7 in) circumference and 28 ounces (794 g) weight
- Venue: a road

Presence
- Country or region: Ireland
- Olympic: no
- World Championships: yes
- Paralympic: no

Road bowling (Irish: ból an bhóthair; also called bullets or long bullets) is an Irish sport in which competitors attempt to take the fewest throws to propel a metal ball along a predetermined course of country roads. The sport originated in Ireland and is mainly played in counties Armagh and Cork. Road bowling in Ireland is governed by the voluntary Irish Road Bowling Association (Irish: Ból Chumann na hÉireann).

A similar sport, Klootschieten, is played in eastern parts of the Netherlands and in northern Germany, with local differences.

== Rules and playing style ==
The "bullet" or "bowl" (Irish: ból) is a solid iron cannonball of c.18 centimetres (7 in) circumference and 28 ounces (794 g) weight. There are two or more players or teams in a match or "score". The one with the fewest shots to the finish line wins. If two players or teams approach the finish line with equal shots, the winner is decided by which throw goes farther past the finish line.

A road shower advises the thrower about the throw, or shot, much like a golf caddy. Another helper stands ahead of the thrower, feet apart, to show the best line or path in the road.

The thrower runs to the throwing mark and, in the Northern or County Armagh style, extends the arm and bowl behind him as he runs. At the throwing mark, the arm is snapped forward by arching the back and shoulders, releasing the bowl underhand before stepping over the mark.

In the Southern or County Cork style, as the thrower runs to the mark, the arm and bowl are lifted up and back, then whirled downward into an underhand throw, releasing the bowl before stepping over the mark.

Wherever the bowl stops, not where it leaves the road surface, a chalk mark is made at the nearest point on the road and the next throw is taken from behind that mark. In Armagh, the mark is usually made by pulling a tuft of grass and dropping it on the road.

Over tight curves, or corners where two roads meet, the bowl may be thrown through the air (lofted). The loft must strike the road or pass over it. If the loft fails to reach the road, it counts as one shot, and the next throw must be taken again from the same mark.

Spectators sometimes bet on the outcome and proffer advice to their favoured competitor in the course of a match.

== History ==
Fintan Lane, in his book Long Bullets: A History of Road Bowling in Ireland, traces the sport to at least the 17th century and suggests that it was once far more widespread than it is today. While some sources state that it is an "indigenous [Irish] sport", other sources suggest that it may have been brought to Ireland by Dutch troops during the Williamite War in Ireland (1689–1691). Until the 19th century, the game was played in Scotland, the north of England and in North America.

In the past, players were given twenty shots (a score) each, the winner determined by who went the greatest distance. Though the modern game is a fixed distance in fewest shots, the expression "score" for a match survives. Disputes between competitors or spectators sometimes created public disturbance and court cases resulted as recently as the 1950s.

Ból Chumann na hÉireann was formed in 1954, at a meeting held in Enniskeane in County Cork, to replace the less organised All-Ireland Bowl Players Association. There were irregular contests between Cork and Armagh champions over the decades, but the first national championship between them was in 1963.

The first World Championship was as part of Cork 800 in 1985.

As part of the response to the COVID-19 pandemic in Ireland, Ból Chumann na hÉireann sanctioned a "temporary ban on the sport". The 2020 All-Ireland road bowling championships were rescheduled to late 2020.

== Geography ==
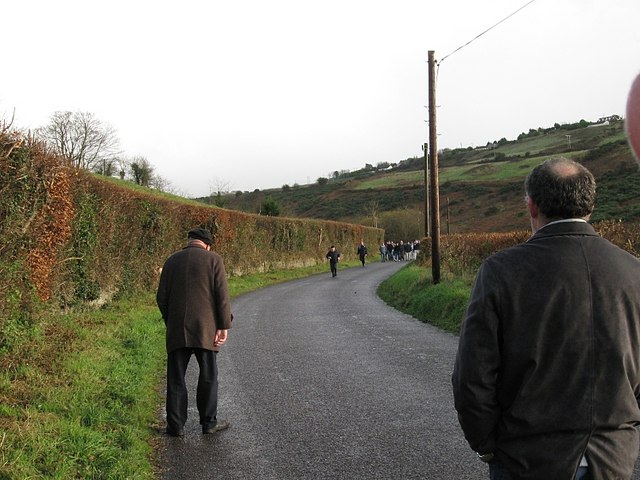
A road bowling event in County Cork in 2008

The Irish form of road bowling is concentrated in counties Cork and Armagh, especially south Armagh. The 2015 All-Ireland Series took place in County Cork, with the 2016 event planned for Madden, County Armagh.

The sport is played in counties Mayo (Castlebar), Limerick, Waterford, Louth, Monaghan and later in Tyrone and Wexford and in Dagenham, London, UK. There is also a club in Newcastle, County Dublin.

The Irish game has players in Boston, Massachusetts; Cambridge, New York, and Bennington, Vermont, vicinity; Indian Lake, New York, Syracuse, New York; Traverse City, Michigan; Asheville, North Carolina; Savannah, Georgia; and Kansas City, Kansas. The sport is growing in the fairs and festivals of the state of West Virginia.

One of the world's largest Irish road bowling events is held annually in September in Wheeling, West Virginia, where it is hosted by a local division of the Ancient Order of Hibernians. In Canada, a contest was held in Colborne, Canada in May 2007.

Klootschieten is a similar game played in the Netherlands and northwest Germany, including in Friesland and Schleswig-Holstein. International events have been staged between these regions and Ireland.

== Terminology ==
The winners of the men's and women's All-Ireland competitions are referred to as the "King of the Roads" and "Queen of the Roads" respectively. Other game terminology, as used primarily in Ireland, includes:

bowl of odds
when one bowler is one full shot fewer than their opponent, i.e., when a bowler is equal to or farther in distance than their opponent, but has thrown one shot fewer.
break butt
To step over the butt before releasing the bowl
bullet
the bowl that is thrown or "shot"
bullets
County Armagh name for the game of road bowling. Also long bullets. See also bullet.
butt
the throwing mark on the road. See also break butt
corner
a sharp curve in the road or a corner where two roads meet. See also open the corner
fág a' bealach!
anglicised as Faugh A Ballagh and meaning "clear the way", to warn spectators on the road in front of the thrower
get sight
see open the corner
kitter-paw
a left-handed thrower (from Irish: citeóg)
loft
to throw through the air.
long bullets
see bullets
open the corner
also get sight. to throw so deeply into the curve that the next throw is a straight shot out.
score
a match
shot
a throw
sop
a tuft of grass placed in the road at a spot where the bowl should first strike the surface. An experienced bowler can "split the sop". From Irish: sop, meaning a "small bundle (of straw)"
stylish bowler
a bowler with a smooth well-coordinated delivery.

== In popular culture ==
The song Out the Road by Gaelic Storm is about a road bowling score. Footage of a road bowling score is included in a YouTube video shot by band founders Pat Murphy and Steve Twigger about their trip to Murphy's native County Cork during the production of their album Chicken Boxer, which includes Out the Road.

The game is featured in the second episode of the TV series Bodkin.

== Notable bowlers ==
- Mick Barry (1919–2014) of Cork was All-Ireland Champion on eight occasions between 1965 and 1975. A road was named after him in 2010.
- John Buckley (b.1939), former Roman Catholic bishop of Cork and Ross, was "still bowl[ing] at the age of 75".
- Ethan Rafferty, who also plays intercounty Gaelic football with Armagh.
