= Chicken Boxer =

Studio album by Gaelic Storm
- Released: July 31, 2012
- Genre: World
- Length: 60:18
- Label: Lost Again Records
- Producer: Steve Twigger

Gaelic Storm chronology
Cabbage (2010)	Chicken Boxer (2012)	The Boathouse (2013)

Chicken Boxer is the ninth album by Celtic band Gaelic Storm. It was released on July 31, 2012.

== Track listing ==
All arrangements by Gaelic Storm.

1. "One More Day Above The Roses" – 3:53
2. "Irish Breakfast Day" – 4:31
3. "Rag And Bone Intro" – 1:06
4. "Rag And Bone" – 3:01
5. "Dead Bird Hill" – 3:59
6. "My Lucky Day" – 3:45
7. "The Bear And The Butcher Boy" – 5:08
8. "Whichever Way The Wind Blows" – 4:36
9. "Cúnla" – 4:36
10. "Out The Road" – 3:56
11. "I Can't Find My Way Home" – 3:08
12. "Marching Free" – 3:39
13. "Stone By Stone" – 3:32
14. "Where E're You Go" – 3:53
15. "The Storks Of Guadalajara" – 4:07
16. "Alligator Arms" – 3:28

== Personnel ==
Gaelic Storm

- Patrick Murphy – accordion, spoons, bodhrán, lead vocals
- Steve Twigger – guitar, bouzouki, mandolin, bodhrán, lead vocals
- Ryan Lacey – djembe, doumbek, surdo, cajón, vocals, various percussion
- Peter Purvis – Highland bagpipes, Uilleann pipes, Deger pipes, whistle, vocals
- Jessie Burns – fiddle, vocals

Additional Personnel

- Michael Ramos - Accordion
- Eric Thorin - Bass
