= Matching Sweaters =

Studio album by Gaelic Storm
- Released: July 24, 2015
- Recorded: The Zone Studios, Austin TX and Hudson Street Studios, Annapolis, MD
- Genre: World
- Length: 44:17
- Label: Lost Again Records
- Producer: Steve Twigger

Gaelic Storm chronology
Full Irish: The Best of Gaelic Storm 2004–2014 (2014)	Matching Sweaters (2015)	Go Climb a Tree (2017)

Matching Sweaters is the twelfth album by Celtic band Gaelic Storm. It was released on July 24, 2015.

== Track listing ==
All arrangements by Gaelic Storm.

1. "Another Stupid Drinking Song" (Steve Twigger, Steve Wehmeyer, Patrick Murphy) – 3:22
2. "Girls' Night in Galway" (Twigger, Wehmeyer, Murphy) – 3:15
3. "Whiskeyed Up and Womaned Out" (Twigger, Wehmeyer, Murphy) – 4:17
4. "The Narwhaling Cheesehead" (Tap Room/Traditional - John Nee's/Traditional - Step on it Darsh/Pete Purvis) – 3:25
5. "Paddy's Rubber Arm" (Twigger, Wehmeyer, Murphy) – 2:58
6. "Six of One" (Twigger, Wehmeyer, Murphy) – 4:08
7. "The Rustling Goat Gang" (Twigger, Wehmeyer, Murphy) – 3:53
8. "Dancing in the Rain" (Twigger, Wehmeyer, Murphy) – 3:45
9. "The Teachers' Snow Day" (Rakes of Kildare/Traditional - Kildare Reel/Purvis - Rombello/Purvis) – 4:19
10. "What a Way to Go" (Twigger, Wehmeyer, Murphy) – 3:49
11. "Son of a Poacher" (Twigger, Wehmeyer, Murphy) – 3:51
12. "If You've Got Time" (Twigger, Wehmeyer, Murphy) – 2:54

== Personnel ==
Gaelic Storm

- Patrick Murphy
- Steve Twigger
- Ryan Lacey
- Peter Purvis
- Kiana Weber

== Charts ==
Chart (2015)	Peak position
US Billboard 200	60
