= Cabbage (Gaelic Storm album) =

Studio album by Gaelic Storm
- Released: August 3, 2010
- Recorded: The Zone, Dripping Springs, Austin, TX
- Genre: World
- Length: 52:40
- Label: Lost Again Records
- Producer: Steve Twigger

Gaelic Storm chronology
What's the Rumpus? (2008)	Cabbage (2010)	Chicken Boxer (2012)

Professional ratings
Review scores
Source	Rating
Allmusic	4/5 stars

Cabbage is the eighth album by Celtic band Gaelic Storm. It was released on August 3, 2010, and reached #73 on the Billboard 200 on August 21, 2010.

== Track listing ==
All arrangements by Gaelic Storm.

No.	Title	Writer(s)	Length
1.	"Raised on Black and Tans"	Steve Twigger, Steve Wehmeyer, Patrick Murphy	3:29
2.	"Space Race"	Twigger, Wehmeyer, Murphy	4:09
3.	"Cyclone McClusky"	Twigger, Wehmeyer	3:55
4.	"Blind Monkey"	T. Ferguson/Pete Purvis - Fingers/Purvis	3:13
5.	"Green Eyes, Red Hair"	Twigger, Wehmeyer, Murphy	3:58
6.	"Just Ran Out of Whiskey"	Twigger	4:21
7.	"Jimmy's Bucket"	Paddy's Return/Traditional - Ping Pong/Purvis - Peggy O'Leary's/Traditional	3:45
8.	"Cecilia"	Paul Simon	3:28
9.	"The Buzzards of Bourbon Street"	Glenlyons/Traditional/Purvis - Danse Breton/Traditional	3:33
10.	"Turn This Ship Around"	Twigger, Wehmeyer, Murphy	4:06
11.	"Rum Runners"	Twigger, Wehmeyer, Murphy	3:41
12.	"Northern Lights"	Twigger, Wehmeyer, Murphy	3:51
13.	"Crazy Eyes McGullicuddy"	Crazy Eyes - Jessie Burns/Kitchen Girl - Traditional/Slapstick Reel - Burns	4:00
14.	"Chucky Timm"	Twigger, Wehmeyer, Murphy	3:11

== Personnel ==
Gaelic Storm

- Patrick Murphy – accordion, spoons, bodhrán, lead vocals
- Steve Twigger – guitar, bouzouki, mandolin, bodhrán, lead vocals
- Ryan Lacey – djembe, doumbek, surdo, cajón, vocals, various percussion
- Peter Purvis – Highland bagpipes, Uilleann pipes, Deger pipes, whistle, vocals
- Jessie Burns – fiddle, vocals

Additional Personnel

- Jeff May – bass
- Kevin Smith – bass
- David Boyle – keyboards
- Michael Ramos – accordion
