= What's the Rumpus? =

Studio album by Gaelic Storm
- Released: July 8, 2008
- Recorded: 2008
- Genre: Irish folk music
- Length: 54:25
- Label: Lost Again Records
- Producer: Steve Twigger

Gaelic Storm chronology
Bring Yer Wellies (2006)	What's the Rumpus? (2008)	Cabbage (2010)

What's the Rumpus? is the seventh album by Celtic band Gaelic Storm. It was released on July 8, 2008 and reached #177 on the Billboard 200.

== Track listing ==
All arrangements by Gaelic Storm.

1. "What's the Rumpus?" (Murphy, Twigger, Wehmeyer) - 3:59
2. "Lover's Wreck (Murphy, Twigger, Wehmeyer) - 3:56
3. "Darcy's Donkey" (Murphy, Twigger, Wehmeyer) - 3:04
4. "The Mechanical Bull" (Burns/trad.) - 4:24
5. "Human to a God" (Twigger, Wehmeyer) - 3:54
6. "Slim Jim and the Seven Eleven Girl" (Twigger) - 4:05
7. "Don't Let the Truth Get in the Way (of a Good Story)" (Murphy, Twigger, Wehmeyer) - 3:30
8. "The Samurai Set" (trad.) - 3:50
9. "Beidh Aonach Amárach" (trad./Sandy Mathers) - 4:11
10. "Death Ride to Durango" (trad.) - 4:34
11. "Faithful Land" (Murphy, Twigger, Wehmeyer) - 4:20
12. "If Good Times Were Dollars" (Twigger) - 3:10
13. "Floating the Flambeau" (Burns/Purvis/trad.) - 4:07
14. "The Night I Punched Russell Crowe" (Murphy, Twigger) - 3:16

== Personnel ==
Gaelic Storm

- Patrick Murphy (vocals, accordion, spoons, harmonica)
- Steve Twigger (guitar, vocals, bodhran)
- Ryan Lacey (percussion, background vocals)
- Peter Purvis (Highland bagpipes, Uilleann pipes, Deger pipes, whistles, Trombone)
- Jessie Burns (fiddle, background vocals)

Additional personnel

- "Crazy" Arthur Brown (vocals on "What's the Rumpus?")
- Jeff May (bass)
- Lloyd Maines (pedal steel, mandolin, banjo)
- David Boyle (keyboards, accordion)
