= Bring Yer Wellies =

Studio album by Gaelic Storm
- Released: July 25, 2006
- Recorded: 2001
- Genre: Irish folk music
- Length: 50:16
- Label: Lost Again Records
- Producer: Steve Twigger

Gaelic Storm chronology
How Are We Getting Home? (2004)	Bring Yer Wellies (2006)	What's the Rumpus? (2008)

Professional ratings
Review scores
Source	Rating
Allmusic	link

Bring Yer Wellies is the sixth album by Celtic band Gaelic Storm. It was released on July 25, 2006. "Wellies" is a nickname for Wellington boots, which feature prominently in the lyrics of "Kelly's Wellies" and on the album cover.

== Track listing ==
All arrangements by Gaelic Storm.

1. "Scalliwag" (Twigger, Murphy) – 3:30
2. "Me and the Moon" (Twigger) – 4:22
3. "Never Drink 'Em Dry (Johnny Tarr's Funeral)" (Murphy, Wehmeyer, Twigger) – 3:02
4. "The Devil Down Below" (Twigger) – 3:24
5. "Dé Luain, Dé Máirt" (Murphy, Twigger, trad. lyrics) – 3:04
6. "Bare in the Basin" (Purvis) – 3:24
7. "Kelly's Wellies" (Murphy, Wehmeyer, Twigger) – 3:52
8. "Slingshot" (trad.) – 3:24
9. "Hello Monday" (Twigger) – 3:17
10. "The Long Way Home" (Twigger) – 4:27
11. "The Salt Lick" (trad.) – 3:43
12. "Don't Go for 'The One'" (Twigger, Murphy) – 2:10
13. "Tornado Alley" (trad.) – 3:35
14. "Kiss Me I'm Irish" (Twigger, Murphy, Wehmeyer, Reid) – 5:02

== Personnel ==
Gaelic Storm

- Patrick Murphy (accordion, harmonica, spoons, lead vocals)
- Steve Twigger (guitar, bouzouki, mandolin, lead vocals)
- Ryan Lacey (drums, percussion)
- Ellery Klein (fiddle, vocals)
- Peter Purvis (Highland bagpipes, Uilleann pipes, Deger pipes, whistles)

Additional personnel

- Jeff May (bass)
- Rob Forkner (bodhran)
- Michael Ramos (accordion)
- Lauren DeAlbert (didgeridoo)

== Sources and links ==
- Bring Yer Wellies at AllMusic
