= Barrage =

Barrage may refer to:

== Entertainment ==
- Barrage (Barrage album), by band Barrage
- Barrage (Paul Bley album), 1965
- Barrage (group), a Canadian violin ensemble
- Barrage (film), a 2017 film
- Barrage (manga), a 2012 shōnen manga by Kōhei Horikoshi
- Barrage (DC Comics), a character from DC Comics
- Barrage (Marvel Comics), a character from Marvel Comics

== Other uses ==
- Barrage (military science), one of a wide range of structures, devices, or measures for constraining or impeding the movement of troops and forces
  - Barrage (artillery), a line or barrier of artillery or depth-charge fire
  - Barrage balloon, a tethered balloon used as an obstacle to attacking aircraft
- Barrage (dam), a type of dam
- Tidal barrage, an artificial obstruction at the mouth of a tidal watercourse
