= Full Irish =

Full Irish may refer to:

- Full Irish breakfast
- The Full Irish, breakfast show
- Full Irish: The Best of Gaelic Storm 2004–2014
