= Heart of the Ocean (disambiguation) =

The Heart of the Ocean is the name of a fictional blue diamond featured prominently in the 1997 film Titanic. The necklace is based on the Tavernier Blue which, as described in the film, disappeared in 1792.

The necklace in the film was handcrafted by the British royal jewellers Asprey & Garrard.

Heart of the Ocean may also refer to:

- Heart Of The Ocean: The Film Music of James Horner, a 1998 album by James Horner
- "Heart of Ocean", a song by Gaelic Storm from the 1999 album Herding Cats

== See also ==
- Ocean's Heart, a 2003 album by Dreamtale
- Heart of the Sea (disambiguation)
