= Tree (Gaelic Storm album) =

Studio album by Gaelic Storm
- Released: June 19, 2001
- Recorded: 2001
- Genre: Irish folk music
- Length: 62:36
- Label: OM Town
- Producer: Jim Cregan

Gaelic Storm chronology
Herding Cats (1999)	Tree (2001)	Special Reserve (2003)

Professional ratings
Review scores
Source	Rating
Allmusic	2.5/5 stars

Tree is a 2001 album by Gaelic Storm.

== Track listing ==
1. "Beggarman"
2. "Before the Night Is Over"
3. "Johnny Tarr"
4. "Swimmin' in the Sea"
5. "The Plouescat Races"
6. "Black Is the Colour"
7. "Mary's Eyes"
8. "New York Girls"
9. "An Poc Ar Buile"
10. "Thirsty Work"
11. "I Thought I Knew You"
12. "Go Home, Girl!"
13. "Midnight Kiss"
14. "Walk Through My Door"

"Beggarman", "Black is the Colour", "New York Girl", "An Poc Ar Buile", and "Go Home Girl" are traditionals. "Beggarman", which is played fast, is a standard in their live set list and features a didgeridoo very prominently. "Black is the Colour", sung by guitarist Steve Twigger, is very slow and mournful, reminiscent of the original composition from the previous album "She Was the Prize". "An Poc Ar Buile" is the band's first venture in the Irish language. The song is normally slowly sung, but Gaelic Storm puts a twist into it by singing it fast, complete with hoots and hollers. "Go Home, Girl" is a faster tune about a girl who falls in love with a gypsy, only to have her advances turned down for an ironic reason.

"The Plouescat Races", "Thirsty Work" and "Midnight Kiss" are the instrumentals, some of which are original composition by the fiddle player Kathleen Keane. The tin whistle is also now prominently featured, especially in "Thirsty Work".

"Before the Night is Over" is an original love song. "Johnny Tarr" is a mainstay for the live set, complete with the nonsensical noise to start it off. It tells the tale of a heavy drinker who drank enough to kill a normal human, but he died of thirst instead. "Swimmin' in the Sea" is a nostalgic song about childhood at the sea and sung by the guitarist Steve Twigger. "I Thought I Knew You", also sung by the guitarist, has fast lyrics with an unusual rhyme scheme about a relationship gone bad. Related to that is the last tune, original but sung by the fiddler, a slow and lamenting song about lonely life on the road. "Mary's Eyes" is a remake of a Janis Ian song, also sung by the fiddler, and is a mournful song about the homeland in the form of a girl.
