= Special Reserve (Gaelic Storm album) =

Compilation album by Gaelic Storm
- Released: August 19, 2003
- Recorded: 2000–2003
- Genre: Irish folk music
- Length: 49:08
- Label: Higher Octave
- Producer: Mark Miller, Jim Cregan, Shep Lonsdale, Steve Twigger, John Whelan, Gaelic Storm

Gaelic Storm chronology
Tree (2001)	Special Reserve (2003)	How Are We Getting Home? (2004)

Professional ratings
Review scores
Source	Rating
Allmusic	3/5 stars

Special Reserve is a 2003 compilation album by Gaelic Storm.

== Track listing ==
1. "Courtin' in the Kitchen"*
2. "Johnny Tarr"
3. "The Schooner Lake Set"*
4. "The Leaving of Liverpool"
5. "Drink The Night Away"
6. "After Hours At McGann's"
7. "Swimmin' In The Sea"
8. "Nancy Whiskey"*
9. "She Was The Prize"
10. "Johnny Jump Up / Morrison's Jig"
11. "Titanic Set"
12. "Tell Me Ma"
13. "Beggarman"

Asterisks indicate songs original to this album.

== Personnel ==
- Patrick Murphy (Accordion, Spoons, Bodhrán, Harmonica, Lead Vocals)
- Steve Twigger (Guitar, Bouzouki, Mandolin, Lead Vocals)
- Samantha Hunt (Fiddle)
- Shep Lonsdale (Djembe, Doumbek, Surdo, & Various Other Percussion)
- Steve Wehmeyer (Bodhrán, Didgeridoo, Vocals)
- Tom Brown (Bagpipes, Tin Whistle, DegerPipes)

== Additional musicians ==
- Deborah Clark Colón (Fiddle on Tracks 1, 3, & 8)

An incomplete greatest hits CD, it also has three new songs. Courtin' in the Kitchen, sometimes known as Capt. Kelly's Kitchen, is a catchy tune about male and female rogues. The Schooner Lake Set is the first by the band to feature bagpipes by the newest member of the band. Nancy Whiskey, also a traditional, is sung by the bodhran player and features electric pipes and a fast catchy set of verses about drinking.
