= Kiana Weber =

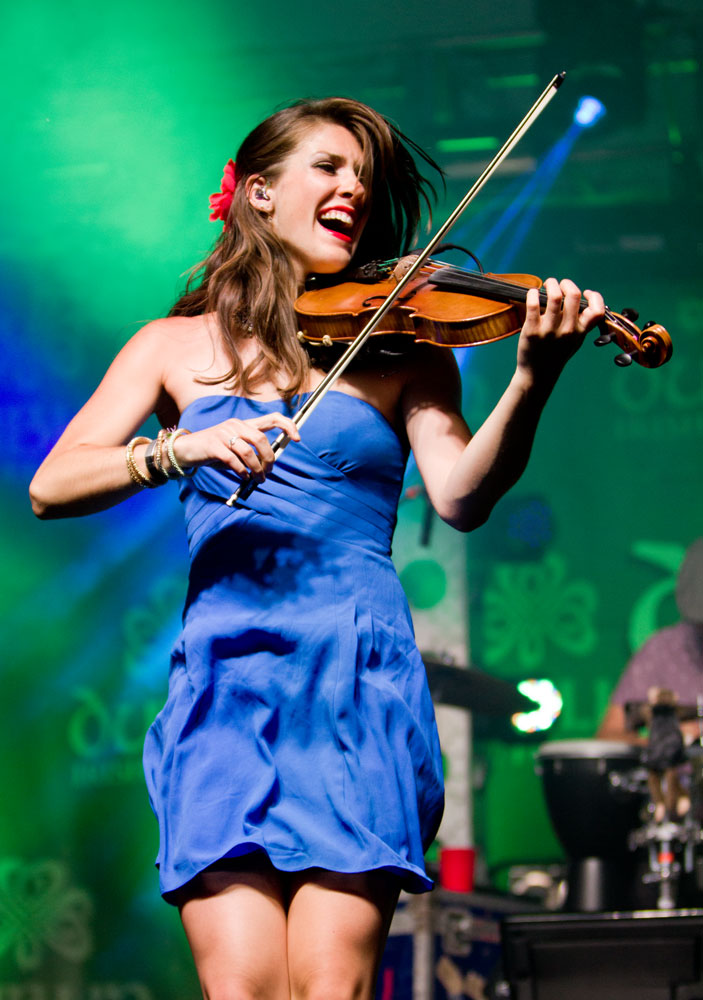
- Weber in Irish Fest 2015 in Dublin, OH

Background information
- Born: January 14, 1990 (age 36); Chelsea, Michigan, United States
- Instrument: Violin
- Formerly of: Gaelic Storm
- Website: kianajune.com

Kiana June Weber (born January 14, 1990) is an American violinist, best known as a former member of the Irish band Gaelic Storm.

== Early life and education ==
Weber was born near Chelsea, Michigan to her parents David Weber and Connie Weber. In 2007 she graduated from Chelsea High School. She later graduated from University of Michigan’s School of Music.

== Career ==
Weber started her career with a Celtic band called The Chelsea House Orchestra. In 2009 Weber joined the Canadian violin troupe, Barrage. She toured with Barrage for three years and appeared in theaters, festival stages, and television specials in North America, Central America, Europe and Asia.

Weber joined Gaelic Storm in the fall of 2012, and played on several albums, including Go Climb a Tree. Weber left the band in the summer of 2017 and was replaced by fiddler Katie Grennan.

Weber played fiddle in the band of the 2018-2019 U.S. touring production of Come From Away.

== Personal life ==
Weber is married to Martin Howley, banjo player for the Irish celtgrass band We Banjo 3.
