= Hevia =

Spanish musician

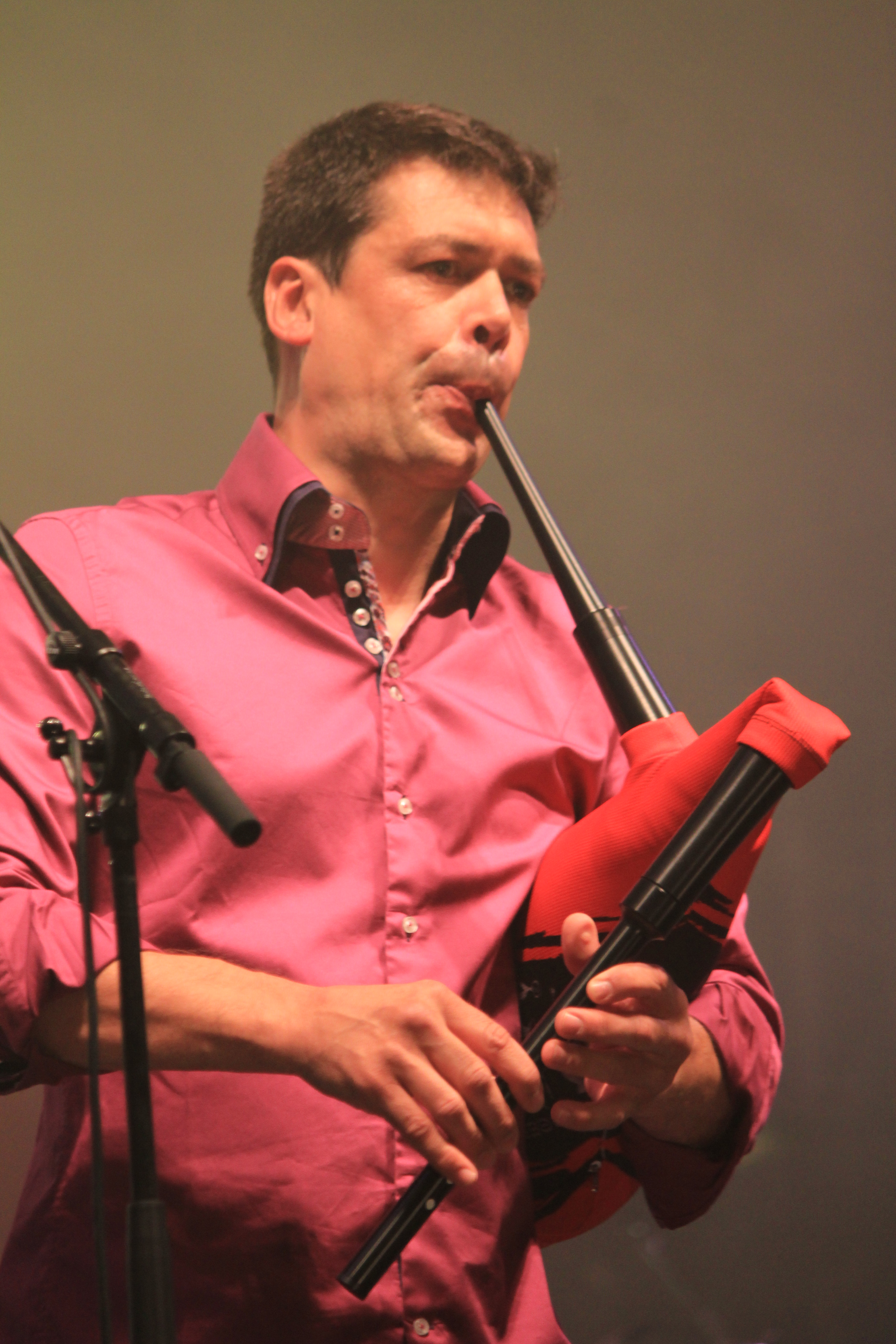
Hevia's concert at Festival Interceltique Lorient 2013

José Ángel Hevia Velasco, known professionally as Hevia (born October 11, 1967 in Villaviciosa, Asturias), is an Asturian bagpiper – specifically, an Asturian gaita player. He commonly performs with his sister, María José, on drums. In 1992 he was awarded first prize for solo bagpipes at the Festival Interceltique de Lorient, Brittany.

Possibly his most recognisable composition is the 1998 piece Busindre Reel, from his first album Tierra de Nadie. Hevia is known for helping invent a special brand of MIDI electronic bagpipes, which he is often seen playing live. The instrument was developed with Alberto Arias (pupil and computer programmer) and the electronic technician Miguel Dopico.

Two of Hevia's tracks, La Línea Trazada and El Garrotin (single release), appeared on the cross-platform video game Vigilante 8: 2nd Offense. His music was also featured in Walt Disney World at Epcot, just before the nightly IllumiNations: Reflections of Earth fireworks show.

== Early years ==
Hevia first came into contact with the bagpipes in 1971 during a procession in Amandi when he was with his grandfather. It was there that the image of a man and his bagpipes influenced the very young Jose Angel. The unity between the pipe player, his music and the instrument seemed magical to him.

Hevia then began bagpipe classes. Three times a week, after school, he took the bus to Gijón. Armando Fernández taught him in the traditional style and then accompanied him back to the bus. He arrived home at 12 o'clock at night and the following day practiced what he had learned in class so he hardly had time for other leisure activities.

== Discography ==
- Tierra de Nadie (No Man's Land), 1998; released 1999 in worldwide
- Al Otro Lado (At the Other Side), 2000
- Etnico Ma Non Troppo, 2003
- Obsesión, 2007
- Lo Mejor De Hevia, 2009

== See also ==
- Spanish bagpipes
