= Mitchell Grobb =

Canadian violinist known for Cirque du Soleil and Barrage

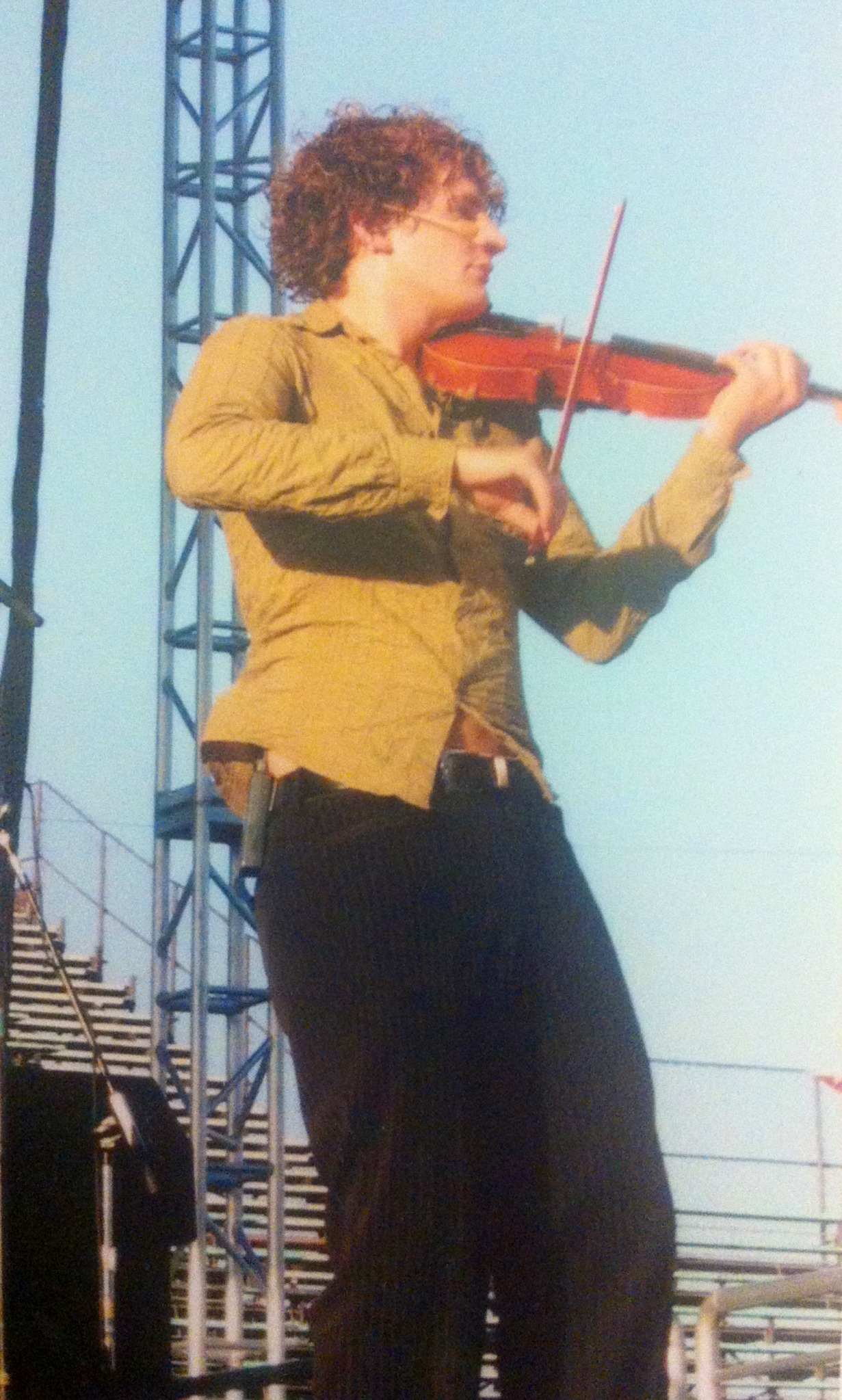
- Mitchell Grobb performing with Barrage in Orange County, California in 2006

Background information
- Born: June 22, 1984 (age 41); Manitoba
- Origin: Carberry, Manitoba, Canada
- Occupations: Violinist, multi-instrumentalist
- Instruments: Violin, electric violin, viola, guitar, mandolin, accordion, vocals
- Website: www.mitchellgrobb.com

Mitchell "Mitch" Grobb (born June 22, 1984) is a Canadian violinist and multi-instrumentalist. He is best known for his live performances and extensive global tours, most notably as a soloist with Cirque du Soleil and Barrage.

== Early life and education ==
Mitchell was raised in rural Manitoba near the town of Carberry. He started playing the violin at age five, studying classical music at the Eckhardt-Grammatté Conservatory of Music at Brandon University. While studying in Brandon, he was a member of the regional youth performance group, the Fantasy Fiddlers, becoming an instructor and performance leader for the youth ensemble at 13 years old. A five-time Manitoba provincial fiddle champion, he was a frequent competitor on the Canadian fiddle contest circuit including multiple appearances as an invited finalist at the Canadian Grand Masters Fiddling Championship.

== Career ==
Grobb began performing professionally at age 17 when he joined the international worldbeat ensemble Barrage. He toured with the company from 2002 to 2006 throughout their Vagabond Tales world tour, and appears as a featured soloist in their full-length concert film. Following his tenure with Barrage, Grobb relocated to Japan to perform as the original violinist and mandolinist in the Tokyo DisneySea production Cape Cod Step Out (2006–2007).

Upon his return to Canada, Grobb collaborated with Roseneath Theatre, performing violin, accordion, and percussion in the 2008 North American tour of Spirit Horse.

In 2010, Grobb joined Cirque du Soleil as the solo violinist in the seasonal winter show Wintuk at Madison Square Garden in New York City. In 2011, he transitioned to Cirque du Soleil's full-time touring shows, performing as the solo violinist and electric violinist for the Dralion arena world tour (2011–2014). He subsequently performed violin in the Grand Chapiteau big-top tours of Ovo in Japan (2014–2015) and Corteo in South America (2015).

Beginning in 2016, Grobb has been the solo violinist and rhythm guitarist for the Ovo arena world tour, performing with multiple iterations of the show in more than 40 countries. Following a touring hiatus during the COVID-19 pandemic, he returned to the stage with Ovo for its March 2022 relaunch at the Microsoft Theater in Los Angeles. The tour traveled to the Canada Life Centre in Winnipeg in August 2022, marking his first performance with Cirque du Soleil in his home province of Manitoba. In early 2026, he was featured during Ovo's high-profile multi-week winter residency at London's Royal Albert Hall.

== Performance style and instrumentation ==
Grobb's musical style incorporates diverse genres, combining classical violin technique with traditional Canadian old-time fiddling, folk, rock, and pop music. His stylistic range also includes elements of jazz, bluegrass, and Celtic musical traditions developed under his early musical mentors.

While primarily recognized for his violin performances, he actively performs on multiple instruments during live touring productions:

- Violin: His primary instrument, spanning classical performance, competitive Canadian fiddling, and highly theatrical/physical live shows.
- Mandolin: Used as a secondary acoustic role, notably documented during his tenure in Tokyo DisneySea's production of Cape Cod Step Out.
- Guitar: Integrated into his contemporary live sets with Cirque du Soleil. During touring performances of Ovo, Grobb frequently transitions between violin, electric guitar, and acoustic guitar live on stage as part of the production's active musical ensemble.

== Discography ==
This discography is incomplete. It includes some, but not all recordings on which Mitchell Grobb is a guest musician.

- Mitchell Grobb, Part of Me (2000) – fiddle
- The Fantasy Fiddlers, Off the Cuff (2001) – fiddle
- Canadian Grand Masters, Live from the 2002 Competition (2002) – fiddle
- Barrage, Vagabond Tales (2003) – violin, vocals
- Janice Moro, Sometimes (2009) – violin
- James Mann, It's About Time (2012) – violin

== Filmography ==
- Barrage, Vagabond Tales (2003) (DVD) – violin, vocals
- Barrage, The Making of Vagabond Tales (2003) (Documentary)
- Walt Disney Company, A Magical Gathering (2004) – violin
- Barrage, Running Horses (2005) (Music Video) – violin
