= How Are We Getting Home? =

Studio album by Gaelic Storm
- Released: August 3, 2004
- Recorded: 2003
- Genre: Irish folk music
- Length: 62:36
- Label: Lost Again
- Producer: Mark Miller

Gaelic Storm chronology
Special Reserve (2003)	How Are We Getting Home? (2004)	Bring Yer Wellies (2006)

Professional ratings
Review scores
Source	Rating
Allmusic	3/5 stars

How Are We Getting Home? is a 2004 album by Gaelic Storm. This album features the most original compositions to date by Gaelic Storm, and features a working class theme. The band also introduced a new percussionist and fiddler.

"I Miss My Home" is a sing-along about traveling and being homesick for the cobble streets of your town. "Born to be a Bachelor" celebrates single life and also features the electric pipes and didgeridoo. "Punjab Paddy" has Indian undertones and celebrates leaving Ireland behind for exotic India. "Summer's Gone", "Fish and Get Fat", "When I Win", "Down Underground" and "Time Drink 'Em Up" are all sung by the guitarist. "Summer's Gone" is about the end of a relationship that shouldn't end, "Fish and Get Fat" is the anthem for all frustrated workers. "When I Win" could also be an anthem for workers, but it is simply for big dreamers. "Down Underground" is a slow song that serves as a tribute to blue collar workers who live and die in the mines. "Time, Drink 'Em Up" is a pub sing along about all the people you might find in a pub. "Stain the Grout", "Cab Ride to Kingston" and "The Lone-Star Stowaway" are all instrumentals. The first two feature the pipes and the last features the fiddle. "Tear Upon the Rose" is a slow song about the necessary pain of leaving your homeland. "Piña Colada in a Pint Glass", a mainstay live, is the song about a waitress who saves up her money to vacation someplace warm, complete with papaya, rum and coconut. "Short a Couple a' Bob" is reminiscent of the Beggarman in that it is catchy, quick and, tells the tale of a poor, but happy soul. The band's second foray into the Irish language is about An Cailin Deas Rua (the beautiful red-haired girl). The instruments featured are beautifully played and the lyrics, while telling about an unappreciative girlfriend, are extremely catchy.

== Track listing ==
1. "I Miss My Home" (Murphy/Twigger/Wehmeyer/Reid; arr. by Gaelic Storm)
2. "Born to Be a Bachelor" (Murphy/Twigger/Wehmeyer; arr. by Gaelic Storm)
3. "Punjab Paddy" (Murphy/Twigger/Wehmeyer; arr. by Gaelic Storm)
4. "Stain the Grout" (Traditional; arr. and adapted by Gaelic Storm)
5. "Tear Upon the Rose" (Murphy/Twigger/Wehmeyer/Sanders/Sellers; arr. by Gaelic Storm)
6. "Summer's Gone" (Twigger; arr. by Gaelic Storm)
7. "Piña Colada in a Pint Glass" (Murphy/Twigger/Wehmeyer; arr. by Gaelic Storm)
8. "Fish and Get Fat" (Twigger; arr. by Gaelic Storm)
9. "The Lone-Star Stowaway" (Traditional/Ed Reavey; arr. and adapted by Gaelic Storm)
10. "When I Win" (Twigger; arr. by Gaelic Storm)
11. "An Cailin Deas Rua" (Traditional; additional words & music Murphy/Twigger/Wehmeyer; arr. Gaelic Storm)
12. "Down Underground" (Murphy/Twigger/Wehmeyer/Reid; arr. by Gaelic Storm)
13. "Cab Ride to Kingston": "The Moving Cloud" (Traditional)/"Jenny Dang the Weaver" (Traditional)/"The Korgi" (John Walsh); arr. and adapted by Gaelic Storm)
14. "Time, Drink 'Em Up!" (Twigger/Wehmeyer; arr. by Gaelic Storm))
15. "Short a Couple A' Bob" (Twigger; arr. by Gaelic Storm)

== Personnel ==
- Patrick Murphy: vocals, harmonica, accordion, spoons
- Steve Twigger: vocals, guitars, bouzouki, mandolin
- Steve Wehmeyer: vocals, bodhran, didgeridoo, assistant saucepan
- Tom Brown: highland bagpipes, deger pipes, tin whistles
- Ryan Lacey: vocals, djembe, doumbeks, percussion, saucepan
- Ellery Klein: fiddle
- Dave Pomeroy: bass guitars
- Nanci Griffith: special guest vocals
