= La Reina del Truébano =

- Genres: Banda de Gaitas, Folk
- Years active: 1996–present
- Members: Musicians from the municipalities of Boal, Illano, Navia, Valdés and Villayón.
- Website: https://www.facebook.com/lareinadeltruebano.bandadegaitas

La Reina del Truébano (literally, in English, the Queen of the Hive) is an Asturian gaitas band formed in 1996. It is known for being a first grade band in Asturias and Spain, and also for its participation in important competitions and festivals in Ireland, United States and France. It is based in Navia and directed by Luis Feito Cano, with Pablo Gonzalez Lopez in charge of the drumming section.

== History ==
La Reina del Truébano was founded in 1996 when musicians from the western part of Asturias got together who had in common the same teacher: Luis Feito Cano. The first presentation was on the 11th of April 1997 in the Campoamor Theater of Oviedo.

Some relevant performances:

- La Ascensión fair, Oviedo 1998 - 2011.
- Premios Príncipe de Asturias 1998 - 2014.
- Festival in Grenoble (France) (Performing with Carlos Núñez), September 1999.
- Nîmes, France. Festival of folkloric groups 2000.
- Festival St. Vallier (France), 19–21 July 2002.
- Programa de TVG "Luar", February 2004 and 2010.
- Festivities of Joan of Arc, Orléans (France), 7–9 May 2004.
- Interceltic Festival of Avilés, July 2004, July 2005, July 2006.
- Festival Interceltique de Lorient (France). 2004 and 2008.
- San Mateo festivities in Oviedo, September 2004, September 2005, September 2006.
- Asturian center of Brussels (Belgium), March 2005.
- Festival de Bandas de Gaitas de Gijón. August 2007 and 2012.
- Carnival of Albi, France, 2007 and 2012.
- Expo 2008- Zaragoza (Universal exposition), July 2008.
- Organization of I, II and III Festival de Bandas de Gaitas Villa de Navia. August 2007, 2008 and 2009.
- Asturian delegation in the St Patrick's Day Parade, New York, (US). 2008, 2012 and 2013
- St. Patrick's Day Festival in Dublín, Ireland, 2011.
- Festivals of Mazamet and Lodeve, France, 2014
- Getxo Folk Festival, 2014
- Gaita bands championships of Asturias.
- Gaita bands championships of Galicia.
- Festival de Ortigueira, multiple years.
- Festival de Bandas de Gaitas de Candás, multiple years.
- Festival Internacional de la Gaita de Villaviciosa, multiple years.
- Performances in the Navia festivities and San Timoteo, Luarca, and a lot more all over Asturias and Spain.

== Uniform and instruments ==
La Reina del Truébano plays asturian gaita in B flat tone, and uses high tension snare drums and tenor and bass drums.

They wear the traditional asturian costume with green, yellow and black colors. The band is recognised for the high quality of their costumes.

== El Enxambre ==
La Reina del Truébano has a band where future gaita players of Asturias and Spain are formed: El Enxambre. This band, formed by kids learning to play gaita and drums, prepare the future musicians to play in La Reina del Truébano

== Recordings ==
- La Danza del Ocho (2000)
- Xalea Real (2003)
- Diez años esmelgando sones (2006)

== Recognitions and awards ==
In 2008, “La Reina del Truébano”, together with Banda de Gaitas de Corvera and Banda de Gaitas de Gozón, participated in the St. Patrick's Day Parade, in New York City, where they obtained the title of "Best Foreign Band" and "Best Overall Band".

In 2008, in the Festival Interceltique de Lorient, the drum section of La Reina del Truébano won the Guinness Trophy for Percussion competing against bands from all over Europe.

In 2010 they obtained a 3rd position in the Liga Galega de Bandas de Gaitas, winning the second phase and also the drumming trophy.

In 2011 they travelled to St Patrick's Day Festival in Dublín, where they were awarded with the "Best Overall Band" title.

== Festival de Bandas de Gaitas "Villa de Navia" ==
In 2007, La Reina del Truebano started organizing the "Festival de Bandas de Gaitas Villa de Navia", which became an annual event. The 2007 festival took place on 13 August, with the following bands:

- El Enxambre.
- Banda de Gaitas Corvera de Asturias.
- La Laguna del Torollu.
- La Reina del Truébano.

In 2008, celebrated 12 August, with the following bands:

- Nova Fronteira (Ourense).
- Banda de Gaitas Villa de Xixón.
- El Enxambre.
- El Penedón de Castropol.
- La Reina del Truébano.

In 2009, given the success achieved in the previous years, the Festival de Bandas de Gaitas Villa de Navia moves to the football field "El Pardo", having that year the following bands:

31 July performed "La Bandina La Coruxa", "La Banda de Gaitas Villa de Avilés" and "La Reina del Truébano".

1 August took place the "Festival de Bandas de Gaitas Villa de Navia" with the following bands:

- El Enxambre.
- El Penedón of Castropol.
- La Reina del Truébano.
- Banda de Gaitas Villa de Avilés.
- Bagad Kevrenn an Arvorig from Brittany.
