= Heart of the Sea =

Heart of the Sea may refer to:

- In the Heart of the Sea, a 2000 book by Nathaniel Philbrick
  - In the Heart of the Sea (film), a 2015 film by Ron Howard based on the book
- Heart of the Sea, a 2000 novel by Nora Roberts
- Heart of the Sea, a 2002 American documentary film about Rell Sunn
- "The Heart of the Sea", a song by Flogging Molly from their 2011 album Speed of Darkness

== See also ==
- Hearts at Sea, a 1950 Italian film
- Heart of the Ocean (disambiguation)
