= Madden, County Armagh =

Village in County Armagh, Northern Ireland

Coordinates: 54°17′N 6°46′W

Madden: Irish: na Madain
- Location within Northern Ireland
- Population: 200
- Irish grid reference: H 81891 38274
  - Belfast: 39 mi (63 km)
  - Dublin: 68 mi (109 km)
- District: Armagh City, Banbridge and Craigavon
- County: County Armagh
- Country: Northern Ireland
- Sovereign state: United Kingdom
- Post town: ARMAGH
- Postcode district: BT60
- Dialling code: 028
- Police: Northern Ireland
- Fire: Northern Ireland
- Ambulance: Northern Ireland
- UK Parliament: Newry and Armagh
- NI Assembly: Newry and Armagh

Madden (also known as Madden Raparees from Irish na Madain) is a small village and townland in County Armagh, Northern Ireland. It is within the Armagh City, Banbridge and Craigavon Borough Council area. It has a population of around 200 people. (2001 Census: 105 people)

== History ==
The current Roman Catholic church at Madden was built in 1998, replacing an earlier building. The Church of Ireland church of St John's, Derrynoose is also in the townland of Madden. The glebe-house for that church was erected by the Reverend James Jones. and was described as "large and handsome". It is now a roofless ruin.

== Education ==
- St. Joseph's Primary School

Modern newly built school

== Sport ==
The main sports in Madden are Gaelic football and Camogie and also played is road bowling. The local GAA club, Madden Raparees GAC (Ropairí na Madan), plays in county competitions at Senior level.

The road bowling club contains a number of All-Ireland champions at various grades.
