= Cúnla =

Irish folk song

"Cúnla" [ˈkuːn̪ˠ.l̪ˠə] is an Irish folk song, originally composed in the Irish language.

== History ==
Cúnla is a sean-nós children's song believed to have been composed sometime in the 14th century. The song is still well known and widely sung in Ireland and recordings have been published by many artists including Joe Heaney on the album The Road from Connemara, The Dubliners, John Spillane, The Chieftains, Christy Moore, Gaelic Storm, Planxty and The Scratch. An original musical setting of a version of the text by composer Michael McGlynn entitled "Cúnnla" has been recorded by Anúna.

== Irish version and translation ==
First verse
Cé hé siúd thíos 'tá ag leagadh na gclaíochaí? x 3
(Who is that down there knocking down the (stone) walls?)
"Mise mé féin" a deir Cúnnla.
("Me, myself" says Cúnla.)

Chorus
A Chúnla a chroí ná tar níos goire dhom! x 3
(Cúnnla dear don't come any nearer to me!)
Go deimhin muise tiocfaidh! a deir Cúnla.
("Surely I will!" says Cúnla.)

Second verse
Cé hé siúd thíos 'tá ag buaileadh na fuinneoige? x 3
(Who is that down there knocking the window?)
"Mise mé féin" a deir Cúnla.
("Me, myself" says Cúnla.)

Third verse
Cé hé siúd thíos 'tá ag fadú na tine dhom? x 3
(Who is that down there fanning the fire for me?)
"Mise mé féin" a deir Cúnla.
("Me, myself" says Cúnla.)

Fourth verse
Cé hé siúd thíos 'tá a' cur uisce sa gciteal dhom? x 3
(Who is that down there putting water into the kettle for me?)
"Mise mé féin" a deir Cúnnla.
("Me, myself" says Cúnla.)

Fifth verse
Cé hé siúd thíos 'tá ag tarraingt na pluide dhíom? x 3
(Who is that down there pulling the blanket off me?)
"Mise mé féin" a deir Cúnnla.
("Me, myself" says Cúnla.)

Sixth verse
Cé hé siúd thíos 'tá ag tochas mo bhonnachaí? x 3
(Who is that down there tickling the soles of my feet?)
"Mise mé féin" a deir Cúnla.
("Me, myself" says Cúnla.)

== English versions ==
There are various English versions translated from the Irish language. Here is a commonly-sung version:

Version #1

As recorded by Planxty on the album 'The Well Below the Valley'

And who is that there knocking the window pane? x 3
'Only me' says Cúnnla

'Chorus'
Cúnla Dear, Don't Come Any Nearer Me x 3
Maybe I Shouldn't, Says Cúnla

And who is that there tickling the toes of me? x 3
'Only me' says Cúnnla

And who is that there tickling the thighs of me? x 3
'Only me' says Cúnnla

== See also ==
- Lullaby
- Celtic Music
- Ireland
- Music of Ireland
- Folk music of Ireland
