= Redpipe =

The redpipe is a brand of electronic bagpipes, an electronic musical instrument made to emulate the sound and characteristics of the bagpipe. In contrast with many other electronic bagpipes which are based solely on a bagpipe chanter, redpipes feature a pressure-sensitive bag in emulation of a bagpipe's bag.

== Overview ==
Redpipes consists of a chanter which, instead of finger-holes, is equipped with sensors that identify the position of the fingers. These sensors transfer signals to microprocessors inside the bag of the instrument. The software implemented in the redpipe stores the different sounds of a variety of bagpipes, including the Great Highland Bagpipe, Scottish smallpipes, gaita, cornamuse, mediaeval bagpipes and hümmelchen. The programming allows different fingerings and tunings.

The bag of the redpipe is stuffed with filling material and a pneumatically driven automatic valve that controls the pressure of the bag. By applying pressure with the arm the player can start and control the chanter and drones, as well as the overblowing function. The pressure that has to be applied to the bag can be adjusted, which allows players handicapped by age or physical restraints to play the instrument easily. The bag must be filled with air before starting to play, either by the breath of the player or automatically.

While most redpipe models are designed to look quite similar to the original models, with drones and a blowpipe, these are only included for design reasons, and some models come without either.

== Sound samples ==
Electronic Great Highland Bagpipe

Electronic Scottish Smallpipe

Electronic_Gaita
