= Mick Barry (bowler) =

Irish road bowler (1919–2014)

Mick Barry (10 January 1919 – 6 December 2014) was an Irish road bowler.

Barry was born in Waterfall outside Cork City and was regarded as the greatest road bowler of all time. His career started in 1937 and continued until his last score at Dublin Hill on 1 June 1997. He won eight All-Ireland titles, the last at the age of 56; the first All-Ireland championships were only held in 1963 when Barry was already in his forties, by which time he had won several Munster titles, which were de facto national crowns.

Barry is famous for lofting a 16 oz. bowl over the Chetwynd Viaduct on St. Patrick's Day 1955. He later lived almost in the shadow of the viaduct. He worked as grounds superintendent at University College Cork for 47 years. In 1999 the national road bowling organisation, Ból-Chumann na hÉireann, named Barry the "Supreme Bowler of the Millennium".

He died aged 95 in 2014. His wife Betty and two of their children predeceased him, but he was survived by three daughters and three sons.
