= Go Climb a Tree =

Studio album by Gaelic Storm
- Released: July 28, 2017
- Recorded: The Zone Studios, Austin TX and Waterford Digital Studios, Millersville MD
- Genre: World
- Length: 46:18
- Label: Lost Again Records
- Producer: Steve Twigger

Gaelic Storm chronology
Matching Sweaters (2015)	Go Climb a Tree (2017)

Go Climb a Tree is the thirteenth album by Celtic band Gaelic Storm. It was released on July 28, 2017.

== Track listing ==
All arrangements by Gaelic Storm.

1. "The Beer Song" - 3:23
2. "Shanghai Kelley" - 2:46
3. "Green, White and Orange" - 4:38
4. "Monday Morning Girl" - 3:56
5. "The Night of Tomfoolery" - 3:37
6. "Shine On" - 4:14
7. "Already Home" - 4:12
8. "Back to the Pub" - 2:52
9. "The Galician Dinky" - 3:56
10. "Weeping Willow" - 4:53
11. "Damn Near Died in Killaloe" - 4:35
12. "Go Climb a Tree" - 3:10

== Personnel ==
Gaelic Storm

- Patrick Murphy
- Steve Twigger
- Ryan Lacey
- Peter Purvis
- Katie Grennan
