= The Boathouse (album) =

Studio album by Gaelic Storm
- Released: August 20, 2013
- Genre: World
- Length: 46:21
- Label: Lost Again Records

Gaelic Storm chronology
Chicken Boxer (2012)	The Boathouse (2013)	Full Irish: The Best of Gaelic Storm 2004–2014 (2014)

The Boathouse is the tenth album by Celtic band Gaelic Storm. It was released on August 20, 2013. The name of the album refers to a boathouse in Annapolis, Maryland, where the tracks were recorded. It spent two weeks at #1 on the Billboard World Album chart.

== Track listing ==
1. "Yarmouth Town" - 4:35
2. "Girls of Dublin Town" - 3:00
3. "Liverpool Judies" - 3:45
4. "My Son John" - 3:30
5. "Down to Old Maui" - 4:35
6. "Mingulay Boat Song" - 5:00
7. "Cape Cod Girls" - 3:26
8. "Weary Whaling Grounds" - 3:09
9. "Essequibo River" - 3:51
10. "Watery Grave" (Steve Twigger) - 4:15
11. "Whiskey Johnny" - 2:41
12. "William Hollander" - 4:39

All are arrangements of traditional songs, except Watery Grave.
