= Ethan Rafferty =

Armagh Gaelic footballer

Personal information
- Native name: Éatán Ó Raifeartaigh (Irish)

Sport
- Sport: Gaelic football
- Position: Midfield, Goalkeeper
Club
- Years: Club
- Grange
Club titles
- Armagh titles: 1
Inter-county
- Years: County
- 2013–: Armagh
Inter-county titles
- Ulster titles: 1
- All-Irelands: 1

Ethan Rafferty is an Irish sportsperson who plays for the Armagh county football team and is an All-Ireland winning road bowler.

== Intercounty ==
Ethan Rafferty made his senior debut for Armagh in 2013 during the McKenna Cup under manager Paul Grimley, and later that year scored three points on his National League debut against Laois. He also found the net in his first Championship appearance, a narrow Ulster defeat to Cavan. That summer he featured in all of Armagh's qualifier games, scoring against both Wicklow and Galway.

In 2014, a leg and ankle injury ruled him out of the latter stages of the National League, which ended in relegation to Division 3. He returned to score two points in the Ulster quarter-final against Cavan, but was sent off.

Rafferty was a key contributor to Armagh's promotion campaign in 2015, scoring 2–14 in the league under new manager Kieran McGeeney. He added scores in the Championship against Donegal, Wicklow and Galway, though Armagh exited in round two of the qualifiers.

In 2016, Rafferty scored in six National League games, but Armagh were again relegated. He hit five points in the Ulster Championship but Armagh fell once more to Cavan.

He opened the 2017 season with a goal against Sligo and scored in subsequent Championship ties with Fermanagh, Kildare and Westmeath as Armagh reached the All-Ireland quarter-final, where they were heavily beaten by Tyrone.

Rafferty remained a regular in 2018, scoring a goal against Sligo and 1–4 against Longford in the League, followed by three points against Offaly. He scored in both Ulster Championship and qualifier games before a serious hip injury against Westmeath ended his season.

Injury delayed his return in 2019, but he re-joined the side in spring, scoring a goal against Fermanagh. He featured again in early 2020 before the season was interrupted by the COVID-19 pandemic. He made a substitute appearance in the Ulster semi-final against Donegal.

Rafferty missed the 2021 season after sustaining a cruciate ligament injury during pre-season.

In 2022, he returned to the Armagh side in a new role as goalkeeper, replacing the injured Blaine Hughes during the National League. He retained the jersey for the Championship, including the All-Ireland quarter-final against Galway, where he scored twice from play before the game was decided on penalties.

Rafferty remained first-choice goalkeeper throughout 2023, contributing scores from open play against Monaghan, Kerry, Donegal, Antrim and Cavan. In the Ulster final against Derry, he scored two points but missed a crucial penalty as Armagh lost in the shootout. Armagh again exited the All-Ireland series on penalties, this time to Monaghan. Later that year, Rafferty suffered a double leg break during a club match against St Peter's, Lurgan.

In 2024, he returned to the Armagh squad in a substitute role as Hughes resumed goalkeeping duties.

Rafferty reclaimed the number one jersey in 2025. Despite considering his future in light of rule changes to Gaelic football, he featured in five league games and remained in goal throughout the Ulster Championship. In the tie against Antrim, he briefly played outfield after receiving a black card.

== Club football ==
Rafferty plays club football for Grange GAC where he won the Armagh Intermediate Football Championship in 2019.

== Road bowls ==
In road bowling, Rafferty won the Ulster intermediate road bowls title on three occasions and the All-Ireland men's intermediate title in 2024.
