= Klootschieten =

Sport in the Netherlands and East Frisia

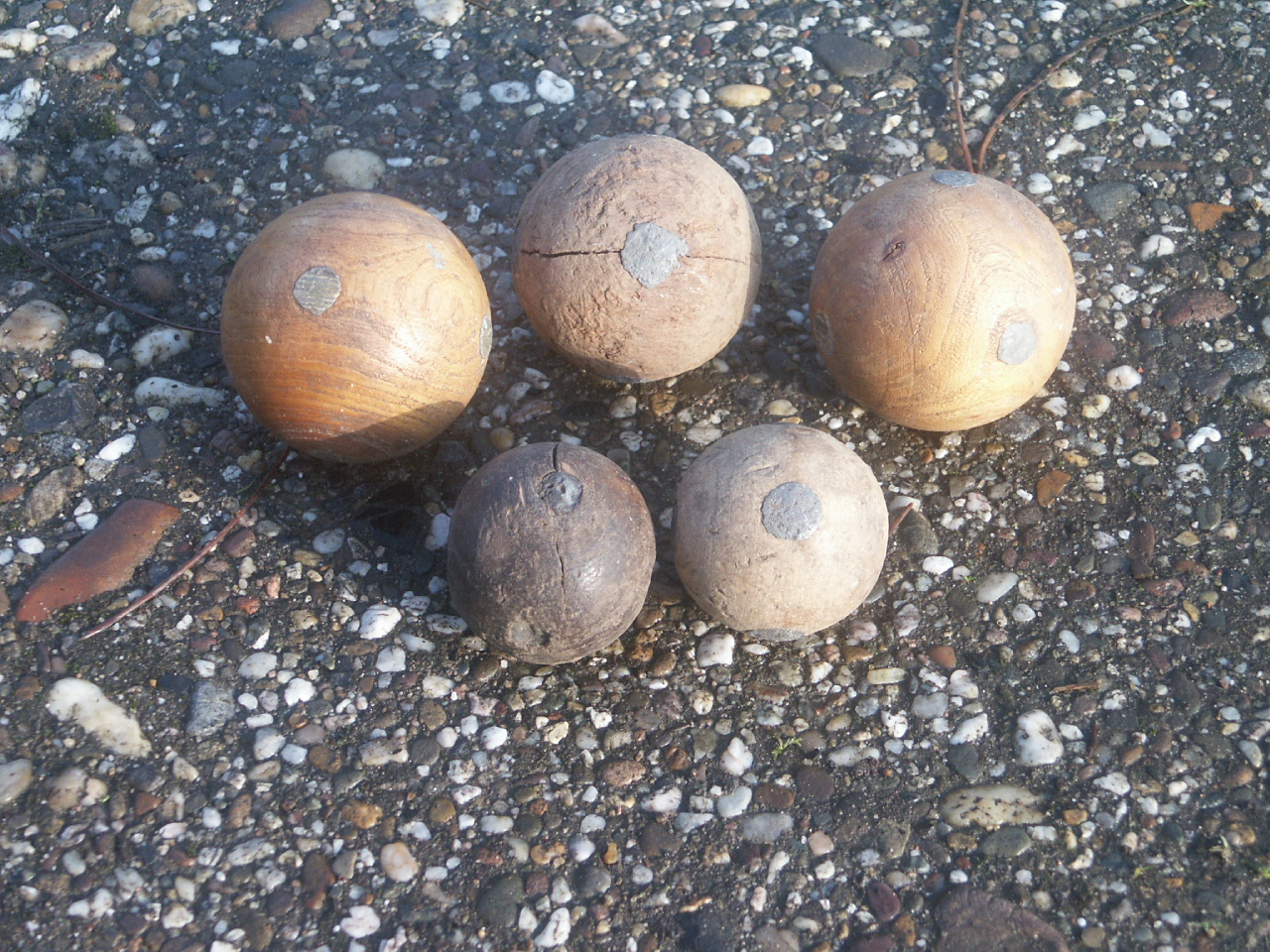
Kloot, the bowl with which the game is played

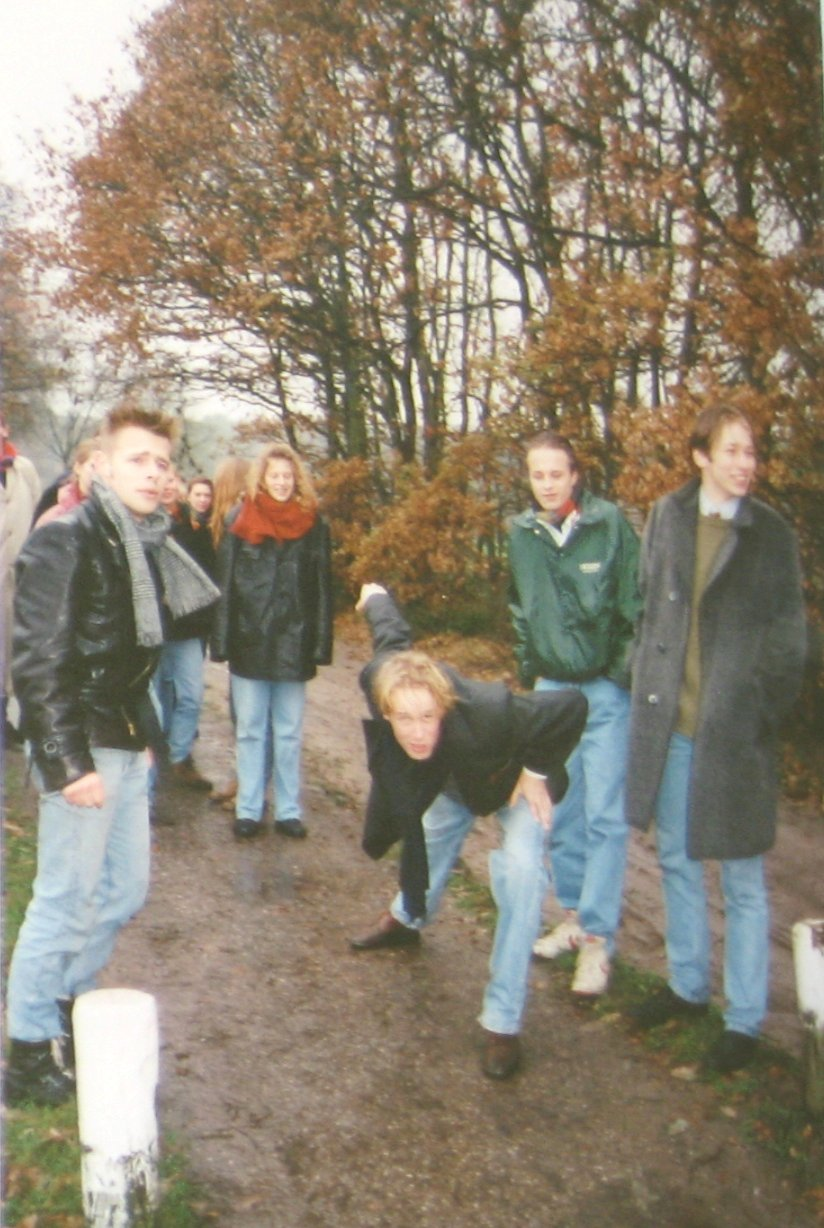
Klootschieten in Twente

Klootschieten (Dutch) (German: Klootschießen, Bosseln or Boßeln; English: 'road bowling' or 'bowl playing') is a sport in the Netherlands, East Frisia, and Northern Germany, most popular in the eastern regions of Twente and Achterhoek. The game is of Frisian origin. To play, participants throw a bowl (the Kloot or Bossel) as far as they can, using a relatively difficult throwing style that requires speed, power, and concentration.

The sport was banned at times, but achieved a measure of respectability when its first league was established by Hinrich Dunkhase in 1902. The sport is divided into field, street, and standing play. Field and street play typically has two teams playing against each other, while standing play is individual.

Stefan Albarus is the current record holder, throwing the ball 106.20 metres (348.4 ft).

== History ==
The term Kloot comes from Low German and derives from Kluten, of similar etymology to English words such as "clod", "clot", "clay" and "cloth" – all ultimately deriving from Proto-Germanic klautaz, meaning a ball or lump. The word Boßeln has origins in the Old High German bôʒen meaning "to push" or "to hit".

Klootschieten likely arose from an ancient Frisian weapon, which the Frisians threw at ships and opponents. The Frisian fighters were supposedly feared for their ability to throw such damaging projectiles. When the sport arose, players used heavy flint and iron balls, weighing up to two pounds or more. Later, fist-sized balls made of applewood were drilled crosswise, and the holes filled with lead to achieve the desired weight.

Historically, klootschieten had a reputation as an asocial activity. In 1659, the Dutch reformer Jacobus van Oudenhoven recorded Kloot werpen on a Sunday after church services in his Register of Sins. Competitions often involved gambling, heavy alcohol consumption, and disorderly conduct. Some matches were physically violent to the point of drawing blood. The sport was primarily played in the winter months, and its traditional light sportswear was considered a risk factor for deaths from pneumonia. For these reasons, authorities occasionally banned the sport, though they were only occasionally successful in enforcing the bans.

Hinrich Dunkhase (1857–1905), Burhave, Butjadingen, brought together the feuding Oldenburg and East Frisian klootschieten players to form the Friesischer Klootschießer-Verband ("Friesian klootschieten Association", FKV) on May 25, 1902. This was the first competitive league developed for the sport. He encouraged more friendly relations between opponents and a more standardized competition structure, to improve the image of the sport. Similar leagues soon sprouted in the surrounding areas. Dunkhase was its chairman until his death.

In the Nazi era, the FKV resisted integration into the National Socialist Imperial Federation for Physical Exercise by not registering as a sporting organization, with the reasoning that klootschieten was not an athletic event but a traditional Friesian game local to the area. The FKV joined the National Socialist Culture Community and therefore retained a certain degree of latitude not granted to sporting clubs. In particular, local dialects of Low German and Frisian could be spoken during competition, which would have been disallowed while playing a sport. After the Second World War, the FKV became a member of the National Sports Association of Lower Saxony registering itself as an official sports league. Today, the FKV is the umbrella organization of more than 40,000 players of Klootschieter and the related game of Boßeln. The sport is also represented in Northern Germany in sports confederations of North Rhine-Westphalia and Schleswig-Holstein.

In the Netherlands, the Nederlandse Klootschietbond (NKB, founded 1967) is the main organization for the sport.

== Styles ==
There are three styles: field, street, and standing (veld, straat, and zetten).

=== Field ===
In the field (veld) version of klootschieten, it is the intention, alone or in a team, to reach a particular patch of grass and/or sand in as few throws as possible (similar in this respect to golf). The course contains curves and variations of height (small hills and valleys and such), so that skill as well as strength is an important factor.

The field kloot is a round bowl of wood or synthetic material, made heavier with lead. The diameter of the kloot is mostly between 7 and 8 centimetres, but these can deviate according to the preference of the participants. There is a minimum diameter of 5 centimetres.

=== Street ===
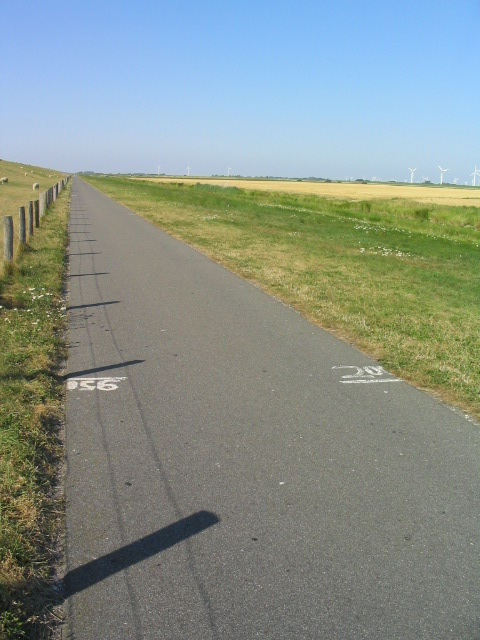
A road in Germany with distance markings for Boßeln

In the street (straat) version of klootschieten, the rules are approximately the same as in the field version, except that the course (being a street, country lane or similar) and the bowl (being heavier) are different. An important consideration in the street version is to keep the bowl away from obstacles such as ditches, gutters, streams, long grass etc., which would reduce the distance of ones "shoot". The experienced player will sometimes deliberately aim for such places on uphill stretches, to avoid the possibility of the bowl rolling back downhill.

=== Standing ===
The goal in the standing or setting (zetten) style is to see how far the kloot (bowl) can travel in the air (similar in this respect to the hammer throw and shotput). Thus, the measure of the throw ends at the point where the kloot hits the ground (in contrast to the field and street variants).

== Similar sports ==
In Germany, the variation similar to the road style is called Boßeln (Bosseln), while Klootschießen traditionally refers to the standing style. It is primarily played along the coast and borders of North Germany, such as in Ostfriesland, Oldenburg, Butjadingen, Dithmarschen, Nordfriesland, Emsland, and Grafschaft Bentheim. It is also played in some parts of North America by German and Dutch immigrants and their descendants.

In Ireland, the Irish Road Bowling Association (Irish: Ból Chumann na hÉireann, founded in 1954) represents players of the Irish analogue of road bowling. The International Bowlplaying Association (IBA, founded in 1969) is the sport's international umbrella organization. Competitions also take place among Irish immigrants in the US and Canada, as it is part of traditional Irish folk culture.

=== European championship ===
European championships (as road bowling) have been held since 1969 (every four years since 1980) between the Netherlands, Ireland and Germany in the three disciplines of field, street and standing competition.

In May 2004, the European Championship was held in Westerstede, Germany.

At the adult level, the German FKB (Friesian Klootschieters Band) won all competitions.

The individual winners:

- Catriona O'Farrell (women's, veld)
- Rena Ahlrichs (women's, straat)
- Ute Uhrbrook (women's, zetten)
- Dirk Taddigs (men's, veld)
- Henning Feyen (men's, straat)
- Stefan Albarus (men's, zetten)

In May 2008, the European Championships were held near Cork, Ireland.

== Records ==
In 1935, the kloot was thrown over the 100-meter mark for the first time, by East Frisian Gerd Gerdes. This record lasted until 1985, when Harm Henkel from Aurich threw 102.00 meters. This new record was beaten the same day by Hans-Georg Bohlken, the "Bear of Ellens", with 105.20 meters. As of January 2006 the record was 106.20 meters, held by Stefan Albarus from Norden in East Frisia.

== See also ==
- Boules
- Irish road bowling
