= Gaita asturiana =

Musical instrument

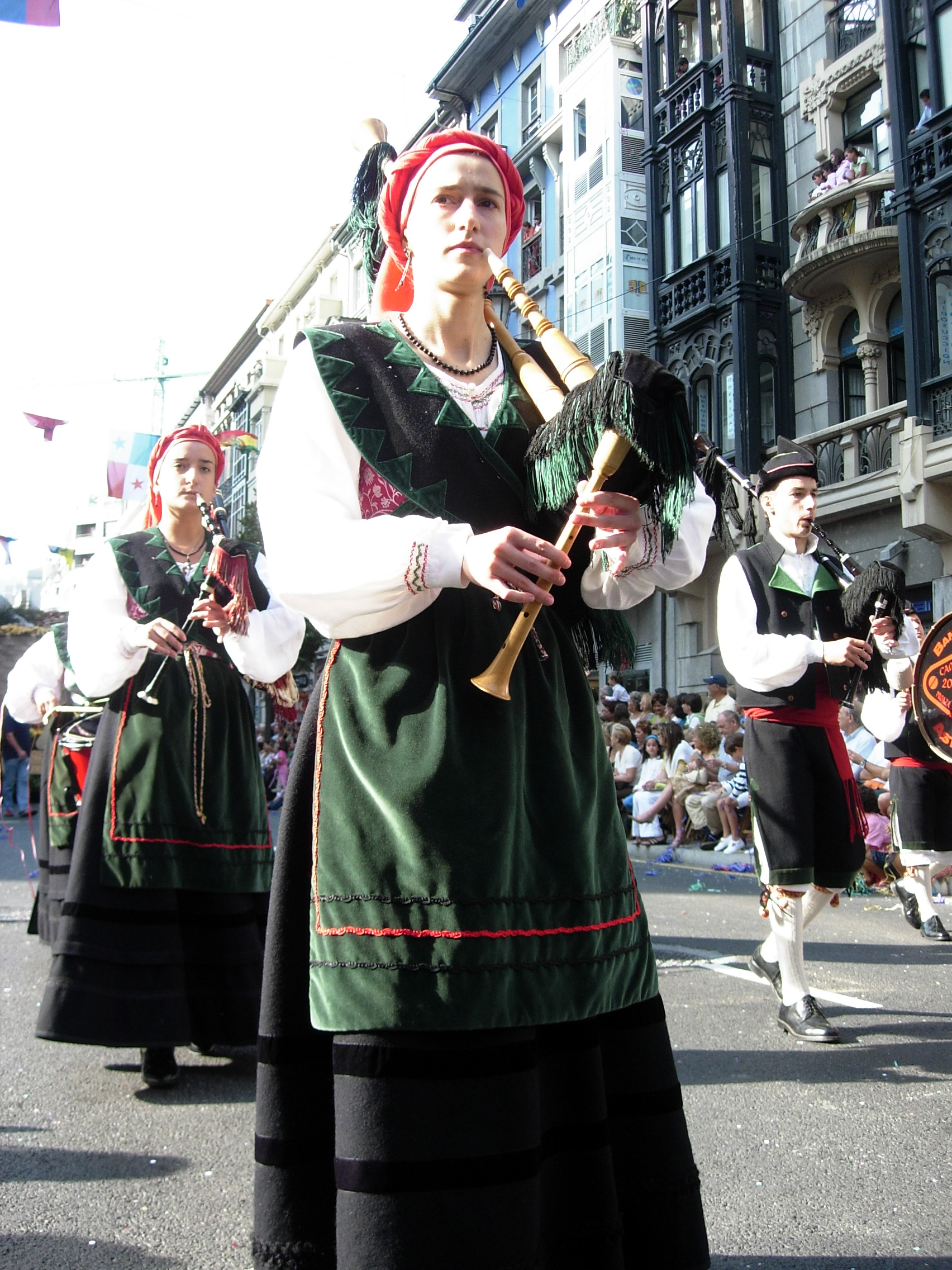
Gaitera

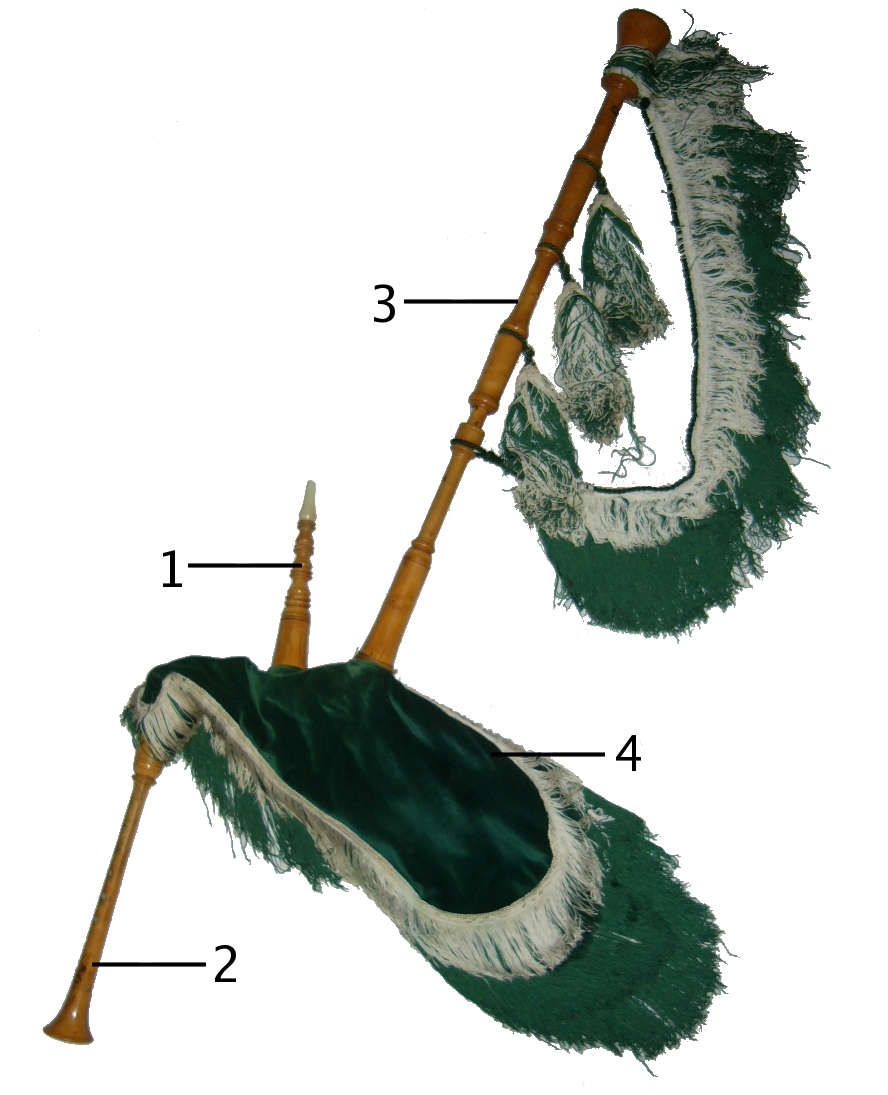

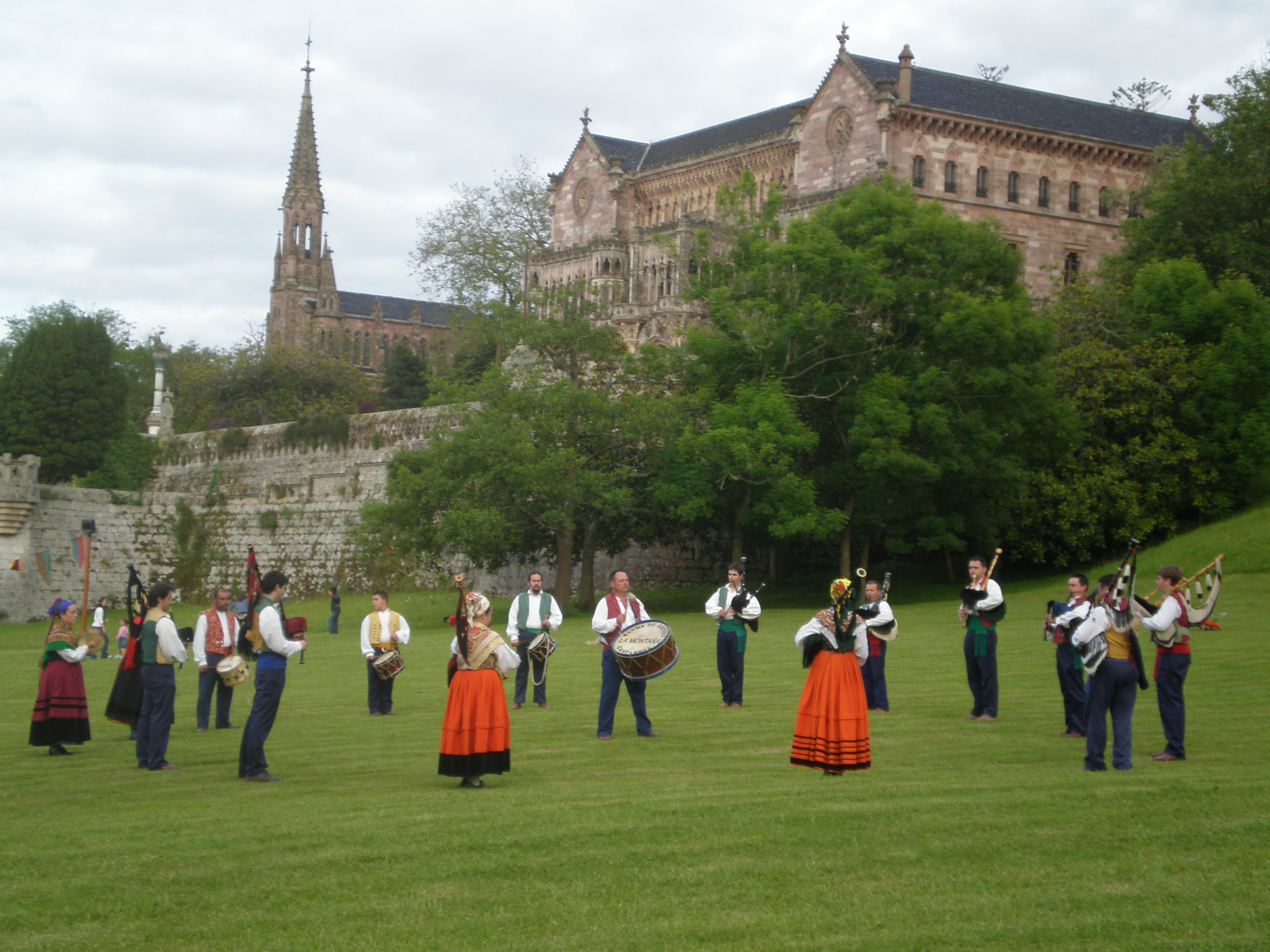
Cantabrian band at Comillas festival

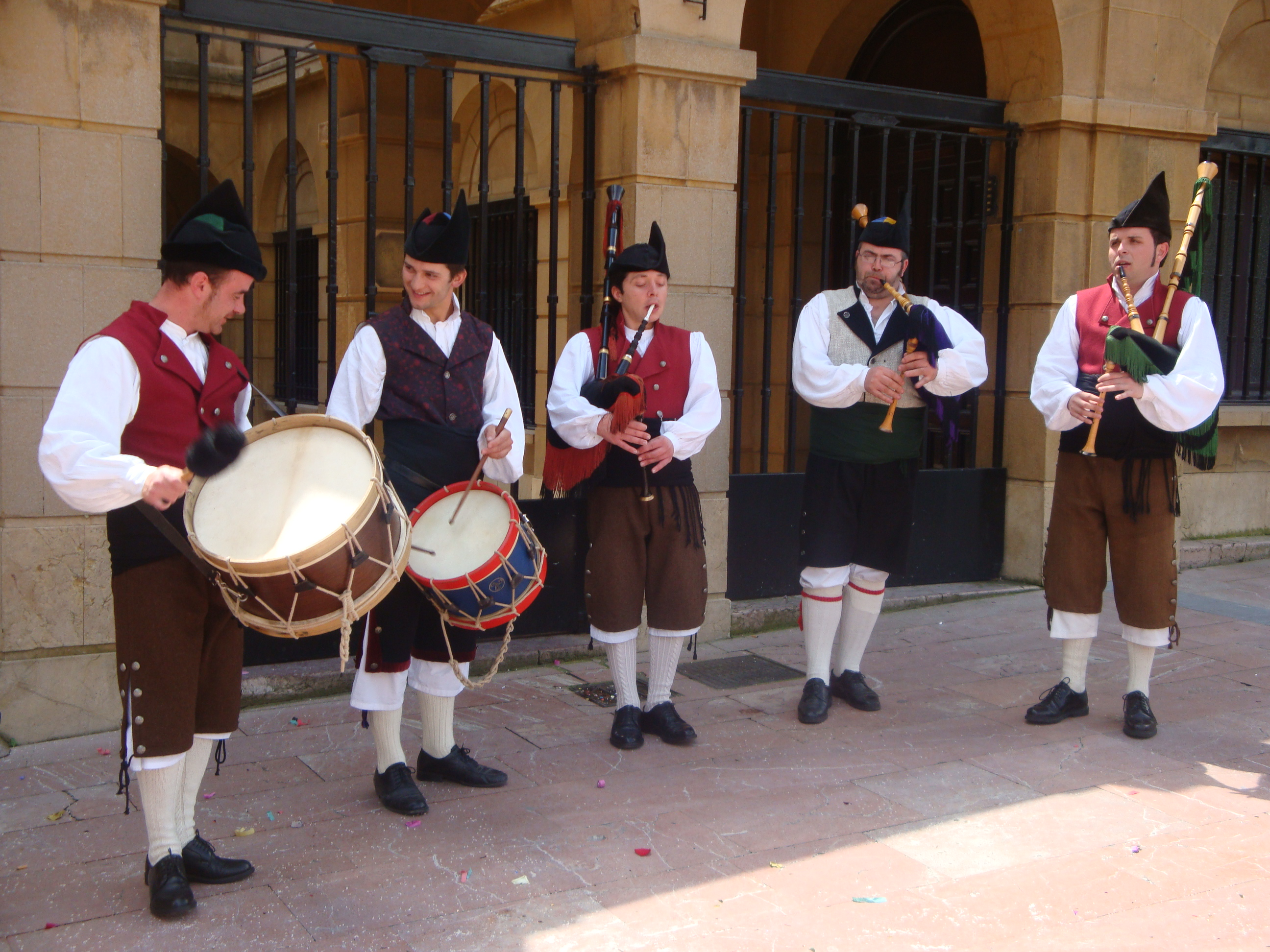
Asturian bagpipers and drummers

The gaita asturiana is a type of bagpipe native to the autonomous communities of Principality of Asturias and Cantabria on the northern coast of Spain.

== Differences from other Iberian gaitas ==
- The gaita asturiana is of longer size than the Galician gaita of the same key; that is to say, its pipes are of longer dimensions. The reed of the chanter (payuela) is of smaller size than the galician reed. Compared to the galician, the finger holes are distributed differently, making it easier to extend to the 4th of the second octave with a simple increase in air pressure on the bag (fuelle), a method known as requintar.
- In the autonomous community of Cantabria this gaita is also called gaita astur-cántabra or gaita cántabra, though it is identical in construction.

== Attestation ==
The first evidence for the existence of the gaita asturiana dates back to the 13th century, as a piper can be seen carved into the capital of the church of Santa María de Villaviciosa. Further evidence includes an illumination of a rabbit playing the gaita in the 14th century text Llibru la regla colorada. An early carving of a wild boar playing the pipes may be seen at the Cathedral of Oviedo.

== History and evolution ==
Traditionally the gaita asturiana had only the two pipes: the chanter and the drone, the same as the gaita gallega. The traditional tuning of the chanter was in C5 (an octave above the piano's Middle C). Traditionally the C of the gaita was between concert C and C#, known as C brillante ("C brilliant"), though examples are also found in D (rare) and B (more frequent, used to accompany male "tonada" singers). Some times it was also possible to see tiny chanters tuned above D. The drone is tuned to the tonic of the chanter, but two octaves lower. However, in the modern day some makers add a tenor drone (ronquín) tuned one octave below the chanter, the same as the ronqueta of the gaita gallega.

== The gaita asturiana today ==
Currently, the gaita asturiana is constructed in a wider array of keys and types, anywhere from A to as high as E♭. Also, refinement of the chanter construction has made it possible to play as high as the tonic in the third octave. Further, the ability to hit chromatic notes has increased, turning the chanter from a completely diatonic instrument to a nearly fully chromatic one. The addition of auxiliary holes has also increased. As a further sign of modernisation, keys have been added to some variants to extend range and chromatic ability.

== Famous gaiteros asturianos ==
In the history of the gaita, there have been numerous notable players. It is necessary to begin with the legendary Gaiteru Llibardón, author of the first recording of the gaita. Throughout the 20th century there have been other famous gaiteros, such as José Remis Vega (aka Capilla and El Gaiteru Margolles) and his son José Remis Ovalle, a reference for today's gaita interpretations.

José Ángel Hevia Velasco, known professionally as Hevia (born 1967 in Villaviciosa, Asturias). Hevia is known for helping invent a special brand of MIDI electronic bagpipes, which he is often seen playing live. He commonly performs with his sister, Maria José, on drums. In 1992 he was awarded first prize for solo bagpipes at the Festival Interceltique de Lorient, Brittany.

La Reina del Truébano is an Asturian gaitero band that has performed in several continents.

== See also ==
- List of bagpipes
