= Full Irish: The Best of Gaelic Storm 2004–2014 =

Compilation album by Gaelic Storm
- Released: July 29, 2014
- Genre: World
- Length: 56:03
- Label: Lost Again Records/ROAR

Gaelic Storm chronology
The Boathouse (2013)	Full Irish: The Best of Gaelic Storm 2004–2014 (2014)	Matching Sweaters (2015)

Full Irish: The Best of Gaelic Storm 2004–2014 is the eleventh album and second compilation album by Celtic band Gaelic Storm. It contains music released by the band between 2004 and 2014, including two new songs. The album was released on July 29, 2014.

== Track listing ==
1. "Scalliwag" - 3:32
2. "Born to Be a Bachelor" - 3:48
3. "Whiskey in the Jar" - 3:29
4. "The Buzzards of Bourbon Street" - 3:32
5. "Raised on Black and Tans" - 3:30
6. "Me and the Moon" - 4:24
7. "Girls of Dublin Town" - 2:59
8. "The Night I Punched Russell Crowe" - 3:27
9. "Irish Party in Third Class" - 3:20
10. "I Miss My Home" - 3:52
11. "Darcy's Donkey" - 3:09
12. "One More Day Above the Roses" - 3:53
13. "Slim Jim and the Seven Eleven Girl" - 4:06
14. "Spider Bite" - 4:05
15. "Kiss Me I'm Irish" - 4:59
