= Barrage (Barrage album) =

Studio album by Barrage
- Released: 2000
- Genre: Fiddle
- Length: 58:38
- Label: Swath Records

Barrage chronology
Barrage (2000)	Vagabond Tales (2003)

Barrage is the self-titled debut album by the Canadian band of the same name. It was recorded by the original members of Barrage and was released in the year 2000. The album features many songs performed in the group's "A Violin Sings, A Fiddle Dances" world concert tour as well as their PBS Television special "The World On Stage".

== Track listing ==
1. "Chopsticken" - 4:02
2. "Old Joe Clark" - 3:08
3. "Sing, Sing, Sing" - 4:38
4. "Mountain Spring" - 4:50
5. "Mahatma" - 6:16
6. "What's Going On?" - 3:51
7. "Row" - 3:31
8. "Calypso Jam" - 3:35
9. "Seven Wicked Reels" - 4:18
10. "Spazz Jazz" - 2:48
11. "The Ukraine" - 3:08
12. "Paralyzed" - 3:23
13. "Allen's Bar" - 3:34
14. "Until We Meet Again" - 3:56
15. "Joe's Favorite" (Live Medley) - 3:44

OTHER RELEASE

1. "Row" - 3:31
2. "Chopsticken" - 4:05
3. "Until We Meet Again" - 3:47
4. "Allen's Bar" - 3:37
5. "Mahatma" - 6:18
6. "Paralyzed" - 3:22
7. "Calypso Jam" - 3:35
8. "Copplestone's Circus" - 4:07
9. "What's Going On?" - 3:51
10. "Old Joe Clark" - 3:09
11. "Mountain Spring" - 4:51
12. "Joe's Favorite (Live Medley)" - 3:43

== Personnel ==
=== Band ===
- Denis Dufresne - violin, vocals
- Scott Duncan - violin, vocals
- Bob Fenske - percussion, mallet instruments
- Errol Fischer - violin, vocals
- Allison Granger - violin, vocals, tin whistle
- Tim Harley - bass
- Roxanne Leitch - violin, vocals, tin whistle, low whistle
- Ken Macrae - drums
- Lynae Dufresne - violin, vocals
- Aaron Young - guitar, mandolin
- Josh Zubot - violin, vocals

=== Guest musicians ===
- John Hyde - acoustic bass
- Michael Alati - drums
- Peter Santiago - bass
- Joanna Peters - percussion
- Christine Forget - background vocals
- Jonathan Moorman - tin whistle
- Joe Segreti - keyboards and guitar

=== Others ===
- John Crozman - A&R
- Jana Wyber - A&R
- Anthony Moore - A&R
