= Herding Cats (album) =

Herding cats

Studio album by Gaelic Storm
- Released: September 20, 1999
- Recorded: 1999
- Genre: Irish folk music
- Length: 51:58
- Label: OM Town
- Producers: John Whelan and Gaelic Storm

Gaelic Storm chronology
Gaelic Storm (1998)	Herding cats (1999)	Tree (2001)

Professional ratings
Review scores
Source	Rating
Allmusic	3/5 stars

Herding Cats is the second studio album by Gaelic Storm, released in 1999. The band was still riding on their fame from their onscreen performance in the 1997 film Titanic.

"Drink the Night Away" is a pub sing-along where raising a glass is implored. "Heart of the Ocean" and "She Was the Prize" are original compositions sung by the guitarist. "Heart of the Ocean" is a longing, slow song while "She Was the Prize" is reminiscent of traditional Irish love songs. "The Ferryman" is the first song by the band to feature a didgeridoo.

"After Hours at McGann's", "Breakfast at Lady A's", "The Park East Polkas", "The Devil Went Down to Doolin", "The Broken Promise" and "Titanic Set" are all fast-paced, foot-tapping instrumentals that were inspired by a great deal of drinking, according to liner notes. "Titanic Set" features the jig "Blarney Pilgrim" and the reel "Drowsy Maggie", which could be heard in the movie Titanic (1997).

"South Australia" is a styled after sailing songs of Irish fame, while "The Barnyards of Delgaty" is a Scottish bothy ballad.

== Track listing ==
1. "Drink the Night Away"
2. "The Ferryman"
3. "South Australia"
4. "After Hours at McGann's"
5. "Heart of the Ocean"
6. "Breakfast at Lady A.'s"
7. "The Park East Polkas"
8. "Spanish Lady"
9. "The Devil Went Down to Doolin"
10. "The Barnyards of Delgaty"
11. "The Broken Promise"
12. "She Was the Prize"
13. "Titanic Set (Medley)"
