= Barrage (group) =

Canadian worldbeat ensemble

Background information
- Origin: Calgary, Alberta, Canada
- Genres: Canadian fiddle, Jazz, World music, Celtic, Bluegrass, Rock music, Pop music, Calypso, Latin, Klezmer, Traditional, Folk
- Years active: 1996–2012
- Members: Aaron Young Alicia Enstrom; Allison Granger; Annette Homann; Anthony Moore; Benjamin Gale; Benjamin Gunnery; Bob Fenske; Brian Hanson; Carly Frey; Charles Bullough; Claire Feeham; Clinton Peletier; Corinna Smith; Daniel Carson; Daniel Pentecost; Dean Marshall; Denis Dufresne; Errol Fischer; Hidayat Honari; Ian Tipping; Jason Graham; Jason Hurwitz; Jeff Falfard; Jessica Hindin; Jimmy Tuffrey; John Crozman; Jonathan McCaslin; Joshua Zubot; Kent Macrae; Kiana Weber; Kristina Bauch; Leah Zeger; Lindy Donia; Lynae Oliver; Matt McDonough; Matthew Harney; Miranda Mulholland; Mitchell Grobb; Naseem Khozein; Phil Smyth; Pierre Cotê; Roxanne Leitch; Sarah Bennett; Scott Duncan; Seonaid Aitken; Shania Evoniuk; Stefan Defilet; Taylor Morris; Tim Harley; Tom Sidebottom Tommy Emmerton
- Website: barrage.org/index_home.html

Barrage was a violin-based, modern worldbeat ensemble based in Calgary, Alberta. The group employed a blend of eclectic violin music with high-energy physical choreography during their performances. They released several albums, and their filmed concert specials were featured on television networks around the world.

Barrage played a diverse mix of material from a wide variety of genres, including Celtic, swing, bluegrass, jazz, rock, calypso, pop, Canadian fiddle and Latin, as well as contemporary versions of traditional material from countries including China, Ukraine, and India.

The group released a statement via Twitter on May 9, 2012, saying that they were suspending their performance and touring schedule indefinitely, effectively disbanding. In November 2015, the producers of Barrage launched a new project called "Barrage8", a string octet that is loosely based on the original Barrage concept.

== History ==
Barrage began as a musical entertainment concept created in Calgary, Alberta in 1996 by musicians Dean Marshall and John Crozman. Together with Jana Wyber, Brian Hanson, and Anthony Moore, they formed Barrage's executive production and creative team, known as "5 to 1 Entertainments". Dean Marshall served as the group's musical director, composer, and arranger.

Barrage originally consisted of seven violinists, along with a four piece backline made up of bass guitar, acoustic/electric guitar, drum set and percussion. In its early days, Barrage's performances concentrated solely on experimenting and exploring new musical ideas. The group initially gained attention for pushing the violin's musical boundaries in their attempts to change the public's general perception, at the time, of what was considered acceptable music to be played using the instrument. The seven violinists began incorporating choreography and several forms of dance into their shows while playing the violin at the same time, thus creating unique visuals to match the various music styles they were performing. Barrage quickly evolved into a hybrid cross between a theatrical music production and a musical ensemble show.

A second cast of Barrage was created by 5 to 1 Entertainments in 2000 and was based in London, England. For a short time, two entirely different casts of Barrage were simultaneously touring and performing the same show in different parts of the world. The two casts were later amalgamated, reverting to a single, eleven-member Canada-based cast.

In 2006, Barrage added a major educational component to their show format and touring schedule, and frequently worked in American schools with their "Energize Your Strings!" program.

== Tours ==
Barrage embarked on three major concert tours during their existence, namely "A Violin Sings, A Fiddle Dances", "Vagabond Tales", and "High Strung". These tours each spanned several years in length, and collectively played to audiences in 27 countries across Asia, Central America, Europe, North America, and Oceania. The group also frequently toured regionally in North America and Europe using the self-titled "'Barrage" show name.

Barrage occasionally performed as a semi-permanent resident show at Epcot in Walt Disney World Florida, Disneyland and Disney California Adventure Park in Anaheim, California, and Chime-Long Paradise in Guangzhou, China.

== Media ==
Barrage released five studio albums, one live album, one greatest hits album and two concert DVDs. It was also the subject of a documentary.

In 1998, Barrage released their first album, Live in Europe, which was recorded live at multiple venues during Barrage's tour of Europe that year. Their self-titled album Barrage, released in 2000, was the group's first studio album. Barrage's second studio album Vagabond Tales was released in 2003 in conjunction with the launch of the group's Vagabond Tales tour, containing many of the songs that were featured in the show. In 2008, Barrage released Scrapbook, a greatest hits album containing popular and well known songs from the group's shows and previous recordings. Also in 2008, Barrage's third studio album High Strung was released, containing music performed by Barrage during their High Strung tour. Winter's Tale was released in 2009 containing a collaboration with Danish vocalist Stig Rossen. In 2011, the group released its last studio album titled Soundtrack of the World.

Barrage released two concert DVDs, The World on Stage (1999) and Vagabond Tales (2003), both of which were broadcast as prime-time concert specials on the PBS network in the United States. A documentary titled Dig a Little Deeper, featuring arrangements of two songs, "Still Falling (For You')" and "Love Is Calling", written by Canadian composer Kevin Hataley, was broadcast in Canada on CBC in 2005. "Still Falling (For You)" was released as a single video produced by Pyramid Productions in 2006.

== Cast ==
Barrage included many different musicians throughout its history, all of whom were selected through worldwide auditions. The musicians came from a variety of musical backgrounds, and many countries--Canada, the United Kingdom, Germany, New Zealand, and the United States, and included violinists Alicia Enstrom, Miranda Mulholland, Mitchell Grobb, Kiana Weber, and drummer Matt McDonough.

== Discography ==
- Live in Europe (1998), Swath Records
- Barrage (2000), Koch Entertainment, The Grapevine Label
- Classic Christmas: A Holiday Song Collection (2001), Madacy Entertainment
- Vagabond Tales (2003), Swath Records
- High Strung (2008), Swath Records
- Scrapbook (2008), Swath Records
- Winter's Tale (2009), Swath Records
- Soundtrack of the World (2012), Swath Records

== Filmography ==
- The World on Stage (1999, full-length concert VHS), Madacy 2 Label Group
- Vagabond Tales (2003, full-length concert DVD), DPTV Media
- Dig A Little Deeper (2005, documentary)
- Performance Videos 2007/2008 (2007)
