= Gaelic Storm =

American Celtic band

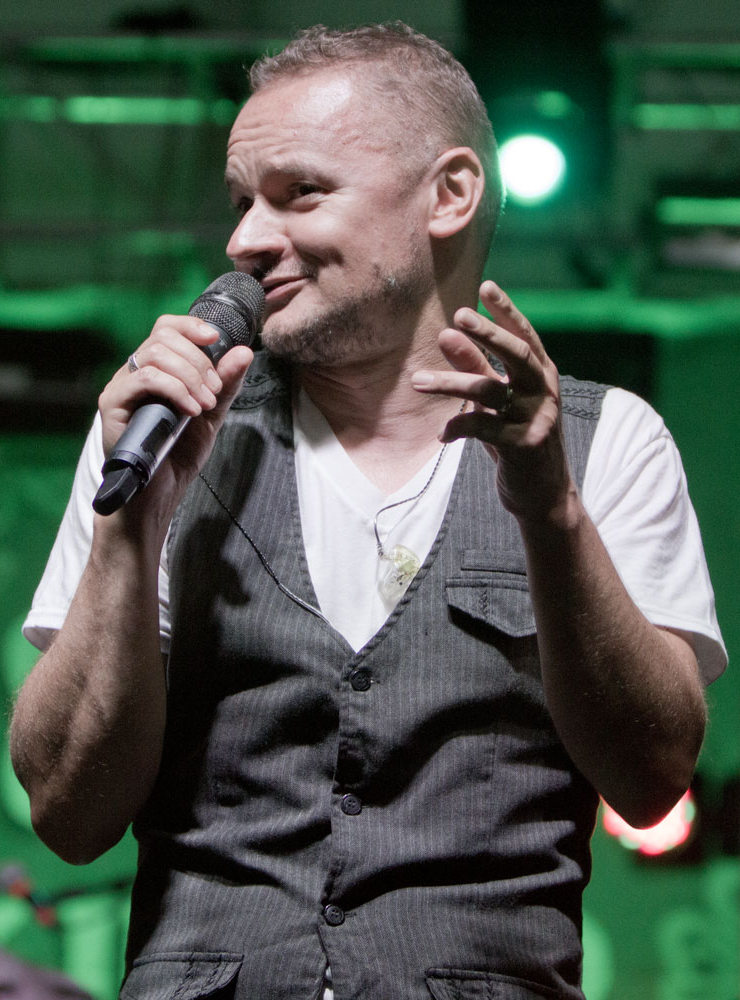
- Patrick Murphy (2015)

Background information
- Origin: Santa Monica, California, United States
- Genres: Celtic, Celtic rock
- Years active: 1996–present
- Labels: Lost Again Records; OmTown Music
- Members: Patrick Murphy; Ryan Lacey; Peter Purvis; Natalya Kay; Parker Hastings
- Past members: Steve Twigger; Katie Grennan; Kiana Weber; Jessie Burns; Shasha Zhang; Bob Banerjee; Tom Brown; Samantha Hunt; Kathleen Keane; Ellery Klein; Shep Lonsdale; Steve Wehmeyer; Brian Walsh
- Website: gaelicstorm.com

Gaelic Storm is an American Celtic band founded in Santa Monica, California, in 1996. Their musical output includes pieces from traditional Irish music, Scottish music, and original tunes in both the Celtic folk and Celtic rock genres. The band appeared in the 1997 film Titanic and contributed songs to the movie's soundtrack album. Additionally, they have released more than a dozen albums of their own, including two compilation albums.

The band is known for their energetic renditions of traditional Irish music and Scottish traditional music, and for their albums which consistently top the Billboard world music charts.

== History ==
In 1996, Patrick Murphy and Steve Wehmeyer joined with Steve Twigger, drummer Shep Lonsdale, fiddler Samantha Hunt, and Uillean piper Brian Walsh to perform at O'Brien's Irish Pub and Restaurant in Santa Monica, California, of which Murphy was the manager. This led to a number of pub performances for the next year.

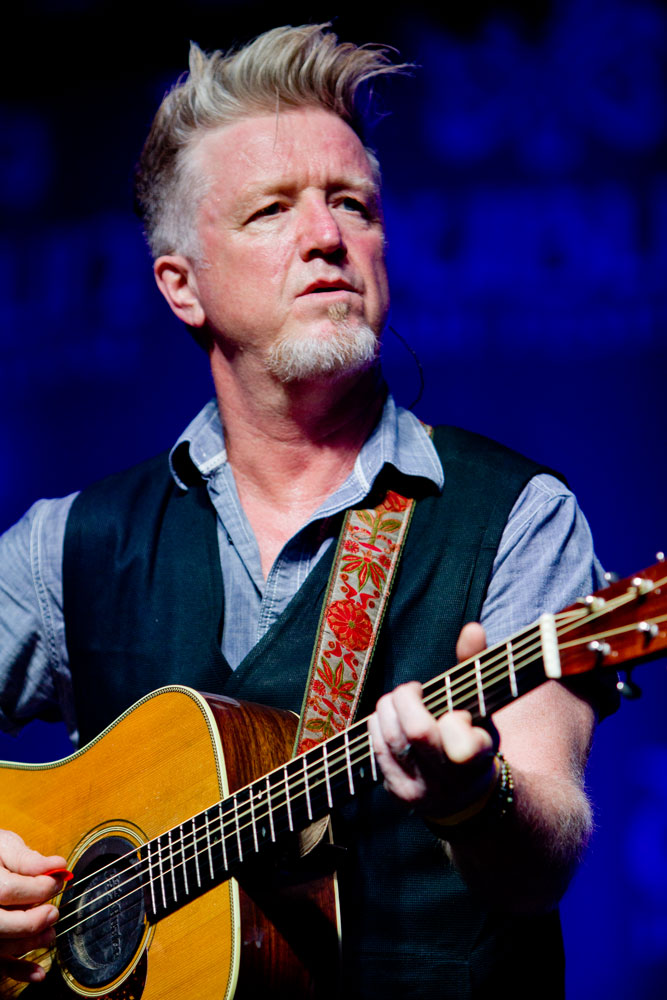
Steve Twigger (2015)

In 1997, Gaelic Storm appeared in the film Titanic as the steerage band, performing "Blarney Pilgrim" (Jig), "John Ryan's Polka", "Kesh Jig" and "Drowsy Maggie" (Reel). (Note: The announcement of "Drowsy Maggy" as next title can be heard in the film) The first two were published on the second soundtrack album as "An Irish Party in Third Class", while the band's second album, Herding Cats, featured "Blarney Pilgrim" and "Drowsy Maggie" as "Titanic Set (Medley)".

Following their appearance in the film, the band began touring extensively, performing in the United States, Canada, the United Kingdom, France and Japan. Brian Walsh departed from the band prior to the recording of their debut album in 1998. Samantha Hunt exited the group in 2000 following the release of their second album.

From 2002 to 2006, the band's membership underwent a transition period. The second fiddler, Kathleen Keane, left the band after their third album "Tree", and drummer Shep Lonsdale left, leaving only Murphy, Wehmeyer, and Twigger as the original members. Their sound engineer at the time, Tom Brown, was also a bagpiper and whistle player and began playing at periods in their show. Ryan Lacey was recruited on drums. This quintet recorded three new tracks for their fourth album, Special Reserve, also a compilation album of their previous three albums. Deborah Clark Colon was the fiddler on the three new tracks, "Courting in the Kitchen," "Schooner Lake Set", and "Nancy Whiskey." Chinese-born Shasha Zhang toured with them on fiddle for several months in 2002. For a brief time in approximately 2003, the band recruited their, to date, only male fiddler, Bob Banerjee. Teresa Gowan was also the group's fiddler during this transitional period. Finally by 2004, Ellery Klein was hired as full time fiddler.

Gaelic Storm's fifth album, How Are We Getting Home?, was released in August 2004 and debuted at #3 on the Billboard World Music Charts, #10 on the Billboard Heatseekers Chart, and re-entered the September 2005 World Albums Chart at #3.

By 2005 Tom Brown had left the band and Peter Purvis was brought in to play bagpipes, uilleann pipes, deger pipes, and whistle.

In January 2006, the band released their first DVD, Gaelic Storm: Live In Chicago, filmed live at the House of Blues in Chicago. In early 2006, founding member Steve Wehmeyer retired full time from the band and became a college professor. As of 2022, he still co-writes the music with Murphy and Twigger, and makes occasional appearances with the band. He is the only member that has not been replaced.

After Wehmeyer's full time departure, the band's membership stabilized and remained largely unchanged with the exception of the position of fiddler, which has since changed hands numerous times.

The band's sixth album, Bring Yer Wellies, was released in July 2006 and debuted at #2 on the Billboard World Chart, #16 on the Internet Sales Chart, and #31 on the Independent Album Chart. Gaelic Storm's next album, What's the Rumpus? was released in 2008 on the band's own label, Lost Again Records. It reached #1 on the Billboard World Chart.

A Simlish version of the song "Scalliwag", from the album Bring Yer Wellies, was recorded and featured on the World music channel in the expansion pack, The Sims 2: Bon Voyage, for the PC game The Sims 2.

As of 2024, Gaelic Storm has announced their new tour, “The Mighty Tour 2,” in which the band High Kings will accompany them. Gaelic Storm also announced in March, that lead guitarist Steve Twigger will not be attending the tour due to health concerns that have led to his absence from the band. Parker Hastings has joined the band to fill the position of guitarist. The current tour, scheduled until April 2025, features Parker Hastings and the current lineup of Peter Purvis, Patrick Murphy, Ryan Lacey, and Natalya Kay. They will be playing a New Year's Eve show in Atlanta with the Zac Brown Band.

Steve Twigger formally announced his retirement from the band on their Facebook page February 27, 2025, leaving Patrick Murphy as the only remaining original member.

As of February 2025, original member Murphy is still in the band, joined by Ryan Lacey (since 2003), Pete Purvis (since 2005) of Merrickville, Ontario, Natalya Kay (since 2022), and Parker Hastings (since 2024).

== Band members ==
=== Current members ===
- Patrick Murphy – accordion, spoons, bodhrán, harmonica, lead vocals (1996–present)
- Ryan Lacey – djembe, doumbek, surdo, cajón, ukulele, vocals, various percussion (2003–present)
- Peter Purvis – highland bagpipes, uilleann pipes, degerpipes, whistle (2005–present)
- Natalya Kay – fiddle, vocals (2022–present)
- Parker Hastings – guitar, lead vocals (2024–present)

=== Former members ===
- Steve Twigger – guitar, bouzouki, mandolin, lead vocals
- Katie Grennan – fiddle, vocals
- Kiana Weber – fiddle, vocals, mandolin
- Jessie Burns – fiddle, vocals
- Brian Walsh – uilleann pipes
- Kathleen Keane – fiddle, whistle, vocals
- Ellery Klein – fiddle, vocals
- Shep Lonsdale – djembe, doumbek, surdo, various percussion
- Steve Wehmeyer – bodhrán, didgeridoo, vocals
- Tom Brown – bagpipes, whistle, degerpipes
- Bob Banerjee – fiddle
- Teresa Gowan – fiddle
- Samantha Hunt – fiddle

=== Guest musicians by album ===
- Herding Cats
  - John Whelan (Button Accordion)
  - Eric Rigler (Uilleann pipes, Low "D" Whistle)
  - Marie Reilly (Fiddle)
- Tree
  - Mike Porcaro (Bass)
- Special Reserve
  - Deborah Clark Colón (Fiddle on Tracks 1, 3, & 8)
- How Are We Getting Home?
  - Dave Pomeroy (Bass guitars)
  - Nanci Griffith (special guest vocals on Track 5)
- Bring Yer Wellies
  - Jeff May (Bass guitar)
  - Rob Forkner (Bodhran)
  - Michael Ramos (Accordion)
  - Lauren Dilbert (Didgeridoo)
- What's the Rumpus?
  - "Crazy" Arthur Brown (Vocals)
  - Jeff May (Bass guitar)
  - Lloyd Maines (pedal steel, Mandolin, Banjo)
  - David Boyle (Keyboards, Accordion)
- Cabbage
  - Jeff May (Bass guitar)
  - Kevin Smith (Bass guitar)
  - David Boyle (Keyboards)
  - Michael Ramos (Accordion)

== Discography ==
- Gaelic Storm (July 28, 1998)
- Herding Cats (September 20, 1999)
- Tree (June 19, 2001)
- Special Reserve (August 19, 2003) (compilation)
- How Are We Getting Home? (August 3, 2004)
- Bring Yer Wellies (July 25, 2006)
- What's The Rumpus? (July 8, 2008)
- Cabbage (August 3, 2010)
- Chicken Boxer (July 31, 2012)
- The Boathouse (August 20, 2013)
- Full Irish: The Best of Gaelic Storm 2004–2014 (July 29, 2014) (compilation)
- Matching Sweaters (July 24, 2015)
- Go Climb a Tree (July 28, 2017)
- One For The Road (March 17, 2021)

== Filmography ==
- Titanic (1997)
- Gaelic Storm Live in Chicago (2006)
