= Electronic bagpipes =

Electronic musical instrument

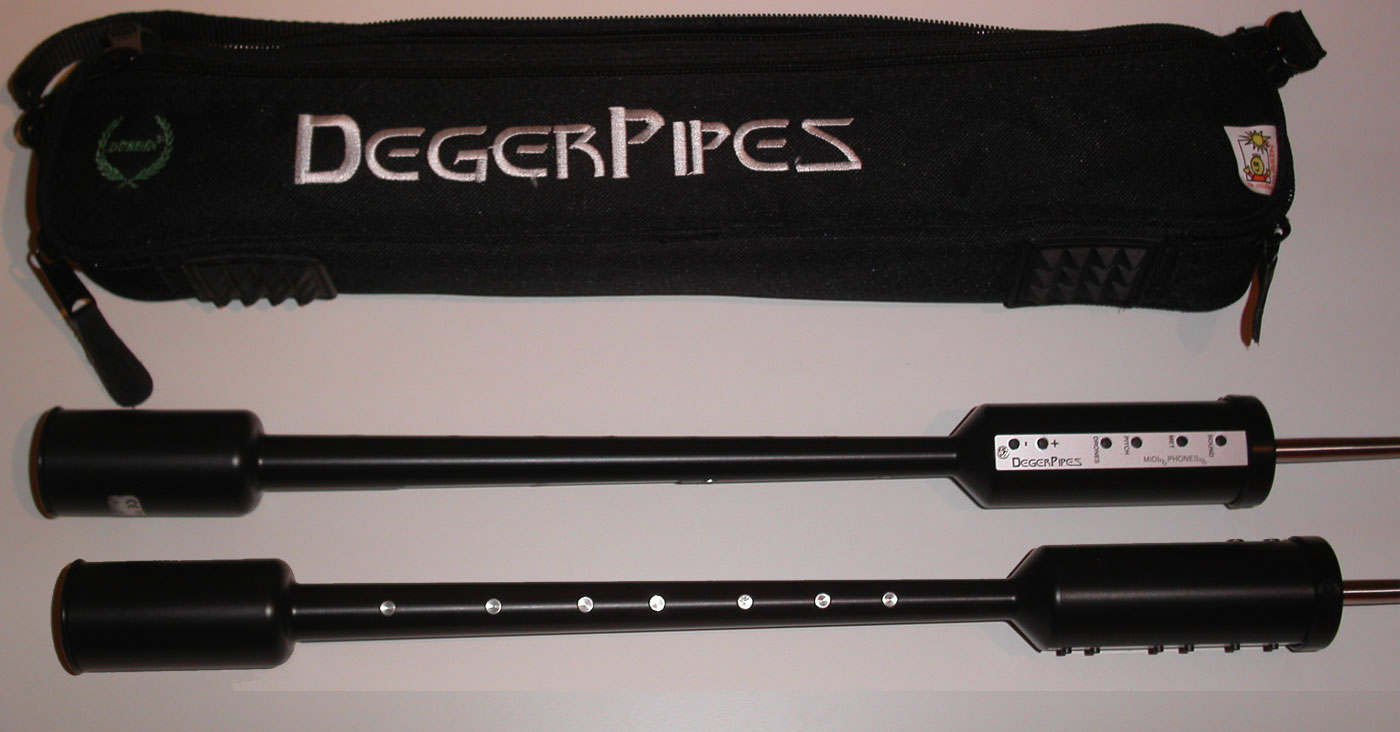
Degerpipes electronic bagpipe chanter

The electronic bagpipes is an electronic musical instrument emulating the tone and/or playing style of the bagpipes. Most electronic bagpipe emulators feature a simulated chanter, which is used to play the melody. Some models also produce a harmonizing drone(s). Some variants employ a simulated bag, wherein the player's pressure on the bag activates a switch maintaining a constant tone. As with other electronic musical instruments, they must be plugged into an instrument amplifier and loudspeaker (or headphones) to hear the sound. Some electronic bagpipes are MIDI controllers that can be plugged into a synth module to create synthesized or sampled bagpipe sounds.

Electronic bagpipes are produced to replicate various types of bagpipes from around the world, including the Scottish Great Highland bagpipe (also known as piob mhor), Irish uilleann pipes, Galician gaita, Asturian gaita French cornemuse, Italian zampogna and Swedish säckpipa.

Electric bagpipes have seen a general rise in contemporary usage, being used for a variety of performances from both amateur and professional musicians.

== History ==
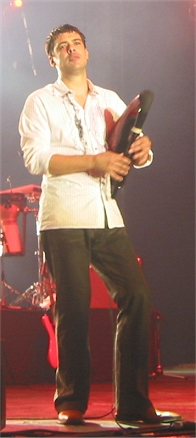
Hevia and his electronic Asturian bagpipe

Electronic bagpipes have been attested as early as 1962, when The Electronic Musical Instrument Manual noted the existence of electronic bagpipes using transistors, caveating: " but there is only one commercial musical instrument on the market and it would seem reasonable to wait for the elimination of some of the less desirable features of transistors..."

In the late 1970s, the late Bazzell Ray Cowan of Austin, Texas, an electronics engineer and piper, developed the first practical electronic bagpipe with an authentic pipe sound, which he called the Bazpipe. In a 1993 interview, Cowan stated the project had originally been in response to a bet with another piper at a wedding. The original version consisted of a chanter (the melody pipe) utilizing gold-plated metal contacts, which in turn were connected to a motherboard, transistors and a speaker, powered by a 6 volt lantern battery, all housed in an extruded plastic "bag" the size and shape of a regular bagpipe bag.

Eventually, with the advance of technology, he was able to downsize it, till by the early 1990s, it consisted of a chanter topped with a 6 x 4 inch plastic box which housed all the components, including a 2-inch speaker, all powered by a 9 volt battery. By his death in 1996, it had become one of a well-known devices of the genre. Many of the later electronic pipes would be modeled on the Bazpipe.

Another pioneer was George H. Boyd, whose system, although not as easily portable as the Bazpipe, produced an authentic "bagpipe" sound. Boyd also developed the first electronic uilleann (Irish) bagpipe, but only made one prototype.

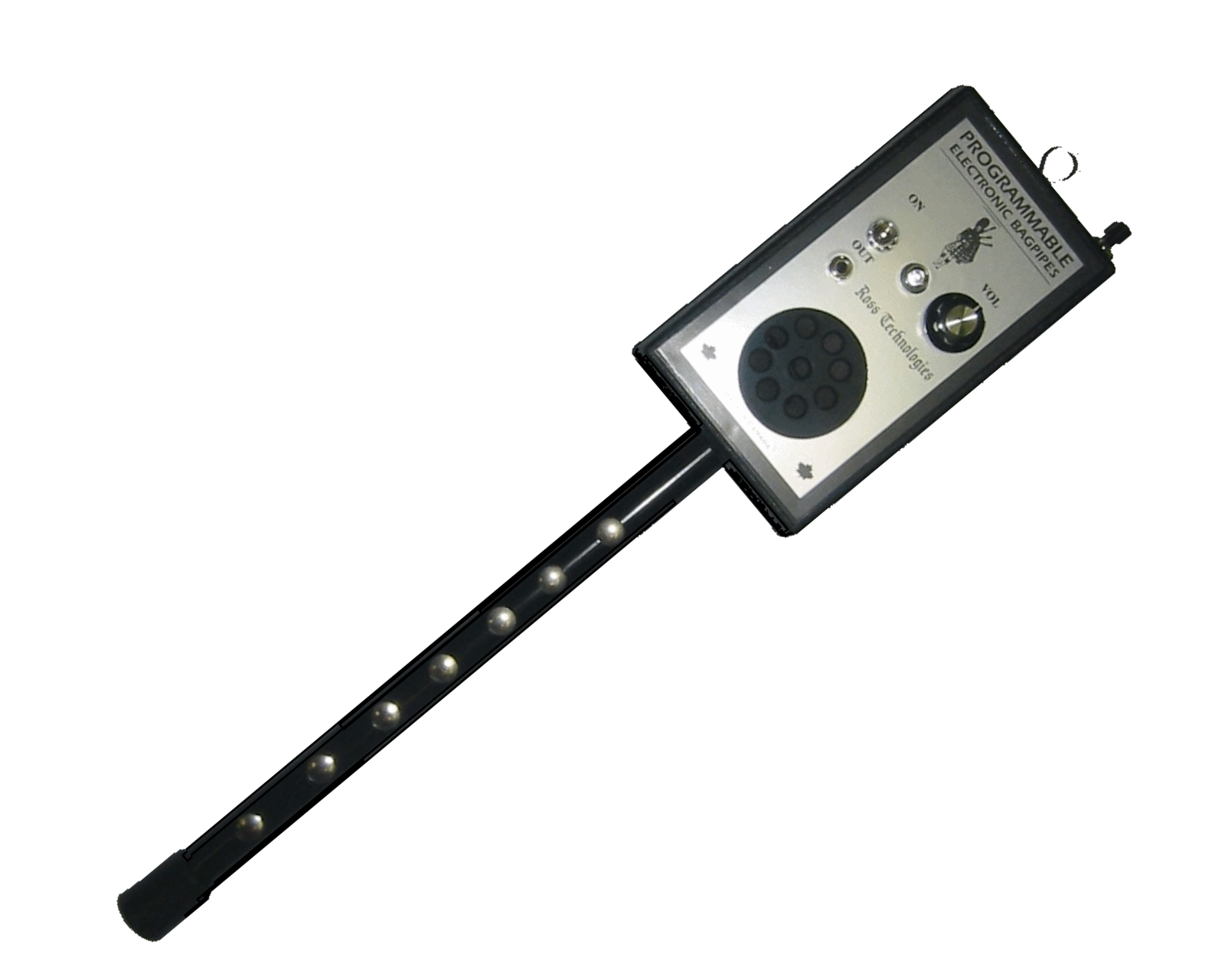
Original style Ross Technologies electronic bagpipes

A range of publications through the 1980s discussed such electronic piping developments, and in 1981 the company Keltronics advertised what they claimed to be "the world's first electronic bagpipes". However, as can be seen from the dates, Cowan's device (and others) pre-dated not only Keltronics, but most other devices.

Other developments included the Ross Technologies Programmable Electronic Bagpipes, which, though looking similar to the Bazpipe, was capable of playing in different keys in order to accompany different instruments. Their second generation model, could not only emulate the Scottish bagpipe and play harmonies, but could emulate other instruments as well. Later models included the MicroPipes, which are a headphones-only electronic practice chanter, and the MidiPipes featuring realistic wavetable sound and MIDI output capability.

Later commercial developments included the work of Anders Fagerström, who in 1991 manufacturing a Scottish Highland practice chanter emulator, and later developed a "full" set electronic pipes emulation. Fagerstrom also produces emulators of the Galician bagpipe and Swedish säckpipa.

Manfred Deger of Germany developed a Scottish Highland pipe emulator with MIDI, and has since expanded its capabilities.

In the early 1990s a multidisciplinary team composed of Alberto Arias, Miguel Dopico and José Ángel Hevia designed and patented an electronic bagpipe. Hevia’s CD “No Man’s Land” was released in 1998 and more than two million copies were sold worldwide. Since then the electronic bagpipe has established itself as a versatile tool in the new musical discourse of European bagpipe playing.

A similar development with a pressure-sensitive bag was made in 2005, the German Rolf Jost, and has since been produced under the brand-name redpipes, in varieties emulating various bagpipes.

Another innovation developed by Ramón M Castro and José Antonio García, is the vPipes, an Irish uilleann pipes emulator with remarkable capabilities, including the ability to make the caoine ("cry" - a slurring, note-bending finger movement which produces a sound characteristic of Irish music). It does not use the General MIDI, instead it uses Emulation Mode, a proprietary interface developed by the vPipes team.

In 2016, a new kind of electronic bagpipes, based on optical finger detection was introduced with the 'a-pipes'.

There is also an electronic bagpipe instrument called Master Gaita, artisanally created under demand by José J. Presedo, which has been in development for more than a decade spawning several iterations, and currently consists of a bagpipe chanter attached to a cushioned bag which contains a USB connector (which creates a MIDI device in the computer) and, optionally, a MIDI connector which can be used to connect a wireless MIDI transmitter stored inside the bag so the instrument works completely wirelessly.

There have also been a number of software programs that have emulated bagpipes using a computer and MIDI interface, as well as computer-based bagpipe music reading and writing programs.

Other recent developments have been made by Michael Eskin, a programmer and piper in California, who has developed several virtual instrument emulator apps for the iPad and iPhone. Among these are bagpipes (including Scottish Highland and smallpipes, Irish uilleann pipes, and Swedish säckpipa), as well as a set of regulators for the iPad which can be played in concert with the uilleann pipe apps. He also produces concertina and accordion apps.

He also advised Andrew Mowry of Oregon who designed and built the WARBL, a MIDI-capable pipe with an optical chanter which can jump the octave, though it lacks the "on-board" voice and speaker of some models, like the Fagerstrom.

There are also some open source approaches to electronic bagpipes like the eChanter, which takes advantage of the widely spread Arduino board and facilitates people with some technical skills to build and customise their own electronic bagpipes.

Most of the modern versions incorporate MIDI capabilities, and have built-in interfaces.

== Players ==
The original instruments were seen mainly as curiosities, or at most, as practice instruments. However, later they were adopted more by certain professional players such as James McColl, a senior Scottish piper, who used a Boyd pipe for practice and demonstrations. Since then the electronic bagpipe has established itself as a versatile tool in the new musical discourse of European bagpipe playing.

Another early adopter of the electronic bagpipe as a performance instrument was Sean Folsom (formerly of the California-based Celtic group, Shiela na Gig) who incorporated one of Cowan's Bazpipes in his wide-ranging exhibition of world bagpipes and other instruments in the early 1990s. Folsom introduced the Bazpipe to a fellow piper in San Diego, who immediately saw the potential, and subsequently incorporated it in performances with his group and on a recording in 1995. Doubtless others were doing the same thing, as their use is now more widely spread

The first widely-selling album of the electronic bagpipe as a performance instrument was by Hevia, whose CD “No Man’s Land” was released in 1998 and more than two million copies were sold worldwide.

Bands and musicians now playing electronic bagpipes include Korn, Ithilien, Eluveitie, Gaelic Storm, Red Hot Chilli Pipers, Seer, Hevia, Nightwish, and The Wiggles.

== See also ==
- Digital accordion - a bellows-driven electronic instrument
