= Steve Twigger =

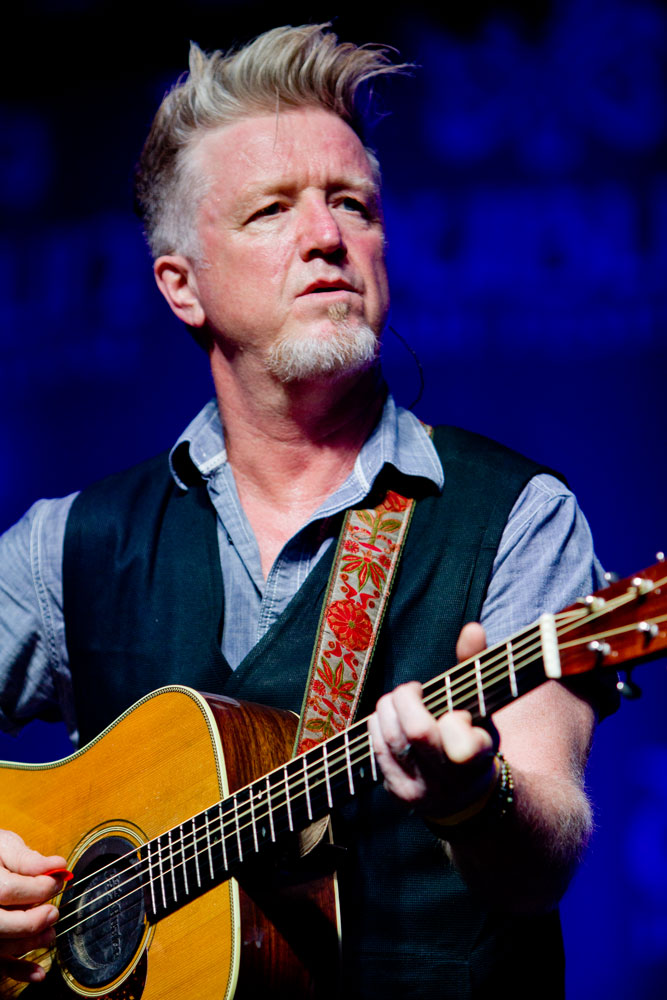
- Twigger performing in Irish Fest in Dublin OH

Background information
- Born: Coventry, England

Steve Twigger is an English musician, best known as the guitarist of the Celtic band Gaelic Storm.

== Early life ==
Twigger was born in Coventry, England.

== Career ==
In 1986 he met a singer-songwriter from Boston and formed an alternative pop band Woodies. After moving to California, he worked in Los Angeles designing movie posters for the Hollywood studios.

In 1996 he founded the Celtic band Gaelic Storm along with Patrick Murphy and three others.

In 1997, he appeared in the film Titanic as part of the steerage band, performing "An Irish Party in Third Class". This appearance catapulted the band into the touring scene.

In 2025 he announced his retirement, having ceased touring with the band the past year due to health concerns.
