= Lăutărească music =

Romanian folk music tradition

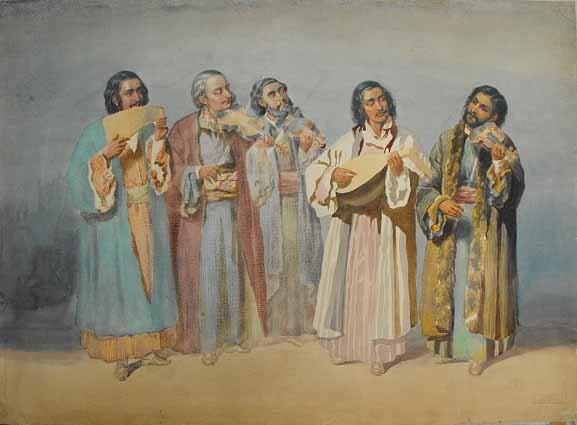
- Taraf of Dumitrache Ochialbi by Carol Szathmari, 1860
- Native name: Romanian: Muzică lăutărească
- Stylistic origins: Romanian pastoral music; Ottoman music; Western classical music; Romanian urban music
- Cultural origins: 14th century, Wallachia, Principality of Moldova, Transylvania
- Typical instruments: violin; cobza; nai; cimbalom; drum; double bass; cimpoi; accordion; taragot; brass instruments

Subgenres
- muzica de mahala; cântec de dragoste; balada or cântecul bătrânesc; muzica de ascultare; muzica de petrecere; muzica de mahala; manele lăutărești

Fusion genres
- Manele

Regional scenes
- Romania, Republic of Moldova

Other topics
- Romanian traditional music

Lăutărească music (Romanian: muzică lăutărească, Romanian pronunciation: [ˈmuzikə lə.utəˈre̯askə]) is a professional music tradition of the Romanian lands, rooted in court and urban life and distinct from peasant and shepherd culture. Its practitioners, known as lăutari (singular lăutar), are predominantly Romani musicians who perform at weddings, village dances, christenings, funerals, and other social events. The tradition is oral: repertoire, technique, and musical knowledge are passed on by ear, within families or from an experienced master, rather than through notation or written theory. In a narrower sense, the term also names an urban vocal and dance genre that developed among lăutari in southern Romania in the early 20th century and did not spread beyond the southern cities.

The central ensemble is the taraf, in which the first violin usually leads: it directs the group, carries the melody, and improvises, while the accompanists provide the rhythmic and harmonic foundation. Instrumentation varied by region and changed over time. In the 18th and 19th centuries the violin, nai, and cobza were the core instruments; in many areas the cimbalom later replaced the cobza, and the accordion joined the taraf in the 20th century. Alongside string tarafs, brass bands (Romanian: fanfare) spread in Moldavia. The repertoire combines traditional dance genres (hora, sârba) and vocal genres (doina, epic ballads) with urban music; its musical language emerged where Ottoman-Balkan and Western European influences met, and its performance style is marked by elaborate ornamentation and free variation.

The profession of the lăutar developed in the era of Romani slavery: musicians served at princely and boyar courts, formed urban guilds from the 18th century onward, and, after emancipation in the mid-19th century, founded urban and rural dynasties. In the early 20th century the taraf took firm root in rural communities. Before then the tradition is known mainly indirectly, from documents, literary accounts, and imprecise transcriptions; sound recordings begin with the fieldwork of Béla Bartók and Constantin Brăiloiu, and systematic study of regional styles and ensemble practice developed in the second half of the 20th century, especially in the work of Speranța Rădulescu. After 1944 the state promoted stage-oriented concert tarafs and folk orchestras, while subjecting everyday lăutari performance to administrative and ideological control and restricting the circulation of urban lăutărească songs.

In contemporary practice, lăutărească music exists in two main forms: a traditional form, tied to folk customs, above all weddings, that retains much of its oral and improvisational character, and a stage form aimed at concert audiences, with a stylized repertoire. Urbanization and globalization have greatly reduced the settings in which the traditional form is still practiced. Since the early 1990s, lăutari ensembles have performed internationally, hybrids with pop music and manele have become widespread, and projects reviving older styles and forgotten repertoire have appeared. Traditional tarafs from Romania were nominated in 2020 for UNESCO's Representative List of the Intangible Cultural Heritage of Humanity.

== Place in Romanian folk music ==
Romanian folk music comprises two coexisting and interacting systems: peasant and shepherd music, and lăutărească music. They differ in repertoire, social function, transmission, and aesthetics. Peasant and shepherd music is the older layer, closely tied to daily life and ritual. Community members perform it for themselves, unpaid, as functional music and as part of ritual. It is typically monophonic and rhythmically free (rubato), and it uses simple wind instruments that performers often make themselves: the fluier (shepherd's flute), bucium (alphorn), and cimpoi (bagpipe). Its vocal repertoire includes doinas, funeral laments (Romanian: bocete), and colinde. Lăutărească music, by contrast, is a professional tradition that developed at courts and in towns, distinct from rural culture: lăutari play for payment, on commission, and for an audience. Unlike peasant music, it is always ensemble-based, relies mainly on string instruments (the violin, cobza, and cimbalom), and is marked by technical virtuosity and openness to outside influences. Lăutari often mediate between ethnic groups, communities, and cultural settings.

Lăutari often take over peasant and shepherd repertoire and rework it, adding ornamentation and technical display. Genres of pastoral origin, including epic ballads, dance music, and wedding repertoire, gradually entered their professional practice. They adopted the peasant doina, which under Balkan and Ottoman influence became more virtuosic and ornamented. Typical lăutărească pairings of a doina with a dance, such as Romanian: doina și hora, lit. 'doina and hora' and Romanian: doina și sârba, lit. 'doina and sârba', also have pastoral precedents, such as the musical poem "When the shepherd lost his sheep". Lăutari likewise absorbed urban and foreign influences, which shaped their genres and performance styles. As they became the principal performers at rural celebrations, amateur peasant musicians lost ground in many regions, and the survival of dance music came to depend on professionals.

Most lăutari are Romani, but the ethnomusicologist Speranța Rădulescu stressed that lăutărească music is not "Gypsy music" as an ethnic category: it is a Romanian tradition that formed among professional musicians and works chiefly within Romanian culture. In her observations, music played for Romani and Romanian audiences largely coincides, there is no clear answer to which pieces are "purely Gypsy", and the difference lies less in the pieces than in how they are played. Romani lăutari were also often the last performers of old Romanian melodies: Rădulescu repeatedly recorded from them tunes that had already vanished from peasant practice. For the musicians themselves, the urban lăutărească song of southern Romania became an emblem of Romani identity. According to Rădulescu and Beissinger, lăutari believe that only they can perform it "properly" and regard musical talent as a distinctive Romani trait.

== History ==
Before the 20th century, lăutărească music was known almost exclusively indirectly: through documents, travel accounts, chronicles, visual evidence, and musical transcriptions that approximated its sound in the terms of European notation. The tradition became directly accessible to study only with the first field sound recordings of the 1900s and 1910s.

=== Origin of the term and early references ===
The name is connected with Romanian: lăută or alăută, a term for a lute-type instrument – an early form of the cobza – borrowed via the oud (Arabic: al-ʿūd). The same word (lăută, lăuta) later came to denote the folk violin in Muntenia, southern Transylvania, Banat, and southern Moldavia. A musician who played the lăută was called an alăutar in the 16th century; from the 17th century, lăutar was applied to performers of all string instruments, including violinists, and in some contexts lăutar and "violinist" became interchangeable. In some regions the profession is still designated by the local name for the violin: scripcar or scripcăraș (from scripcă, northern Moldavia), ceteraș (from ceteră, Maramureș), hegeduș (from higheghe, central Transylvania); in northern Moldavia and Bukovina the name zicălaș (from zicală, a dance melody) is also used.

One of the earliest references to lăutar activity is a 1385 charter of the Wallachian voivode Dan I of Wallachia, granting the Tismana Monastery and Vodița Monastery 40 Romani families; researchers suggest that lăutari musicians may have been among them. The term lăutar (alăutar) is first explicitly recorded in a Moldavian act of 1570, by which voivode Bogdan IV Lăpușneanu granted the vornic Dinga several estates together with Romani slaves, among them lăutari named Stoica, Ruste, and Tâmpa (Stoica alăutar, Ruste alăutar, Tâmpa alăutar); a 1574 document records the purchase of Radu the lăutar together with his dwelling.

=== Slavery, guilds, and the formation of the profession ===
The emergence of the lăutar profession as a distinct trade is usually linked to the social conditions of the period, above all Romani slavery in the Romanian lands, which lasted from the late 14th century until the mid-19th. Princes, boyars, and monasteries owned Romani slaves, among whom musicians were counted alongside craftsmen; as slaves, lăutari provided music for aristocratic life under strict official control. Until the mid-18th century the craft was practiced almost exclusively by Romani slaves, mainly in Muntenia and Moldavia, while Bukovina, Banat, Maramureș, and Transylvania retained a significant share of local musicians. The predominance of Romani musicians contributed to discriminatory attitudes toward the profession: in popular usage, "violinist," lăutar, and "Gypsy" were often treated as synonyms.

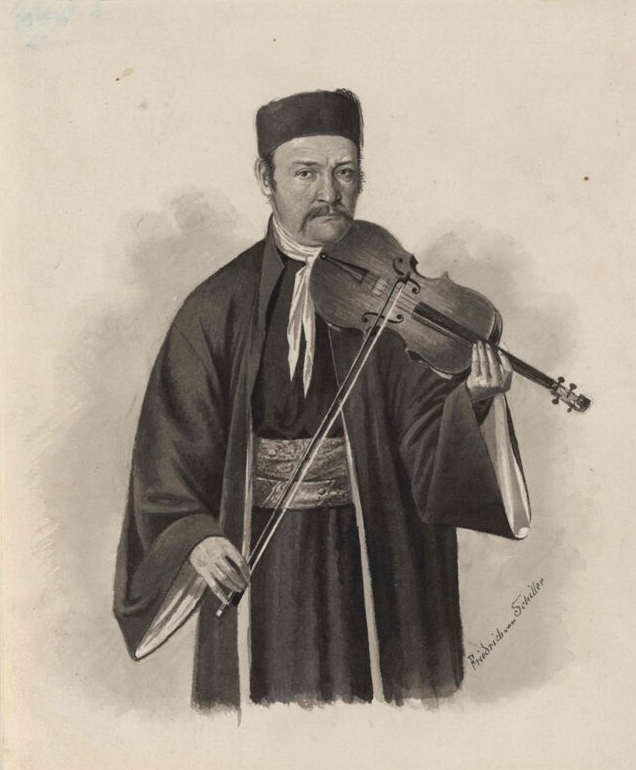
Bukovinian lăutar Nicolae Picu, Austrian gouache, 1899.

As urban market relations developed, the role of the lăutar as a professional musician grew. In the first half of the 18th century, the first professional associations of lăutari – guilds – appeared in towns; members undertook to pay taxes in exchange for control over the local market for musical services. The first recorded guild appeared in Craiova (1723), followed by guilds in Iași (1761) and Huși (1795). Even before official emancipation, some lăutari could practice freely on condition that they paid dues to the voivode. The abolition of slavery (in Moldavia in 1844, Wallachia in 1847, and Bessarabia in 1861) increased Romani people's freedom of movement: some families settled in villages and adopted music as their sole occupation. Over the following decades, rural lăutari dynasties developed – "rural conservatories," in the words of folklorist Ovidiu Bîrlea – in which skills were transmitted orally from father to son within relatively closed professional clans, under what Bîrlea called a "code of professional secrecy." Urban lăutari became one of the Romani groups most integrated into Romanian society; over the 19th century, many of them largely or entirely lost their command of the Romani language.

Characteristic lăutar clothing in the 19th century included the long kaftan-like anteriu and zăbun; such dress marked membership in the professional urban milieu and set lăutari apart from their peasant surroundings. Lăutari in similar dress are shown in an 1860 watercolor of a taraf by Dumitrache Ochialbi. Describing the Bukovinian lăutar Nicolae Picu, musician and politician Leon de Goian noted that he was dressed "in the old Moldavian costume – with a zăbun, anteriu, sash, on his head a flattened fez with a blue tassel"; Picu is shown in the same costume in the 1899 Austrian gouache.

=== Lăutari and the outside world: tours and encounters (18th–19th centuries) ===
From the 18th century onward, lăutar art became part of international cultural exchange: lăutari were invited to courts and aristocratic houses outside the Romanian lands, and later to concert halls; after the 1889 Exposition Universelle in Paris, major tours followed in European, Russian, and American centers. These journeys carried the tradition beyond local communities and established lăutari's reputation as virtuosos.

Romanian folklorist and musicologist Teodor Burada, retelling a story from the journal La Vie Parisienne, described a meeting between Franz Liszt and the head of the Iași lăutari guild, Vasile Barbu – better known as Barbu Lăutaru. According to the account, Liszt was invited in January 1847, during his tour of Transylvania, Wallachia, and Moldavia, to the house of a local boyar, where guests were entertained by Barbu Lăutaru's taraf of violin, nai, and cobza; Liszt was impressed by Barbu's playing and by his ability to reproduce a piano piece by ear. Liszt himself mentions encounters with unnamed lăutari in Bucharest and Iași: "We discovered in them a remarkable vein of great musical heritage" (French: ...nous avons retrouvé chez eux un beau filon de la grande veine musicale).

From the Bukovinian lăutar Nicolae Picu, Liszt recorded several Moldavian dance melodies, including "Corăgheasca," which became a source for one of his Magyar Dalok ("Hungarian Songs"), individually subtitled Romanian Rhapsody (S.242/20) – not to be confused with Enescu's later, better-known work of the same name. Picu was named the most outstanding Bukovinian lăutar in the 24-volume illustrated encyclopedia The Austro-Hungarian Monarchy in Word and Picture (known as the German: Kronprinzenwerk).

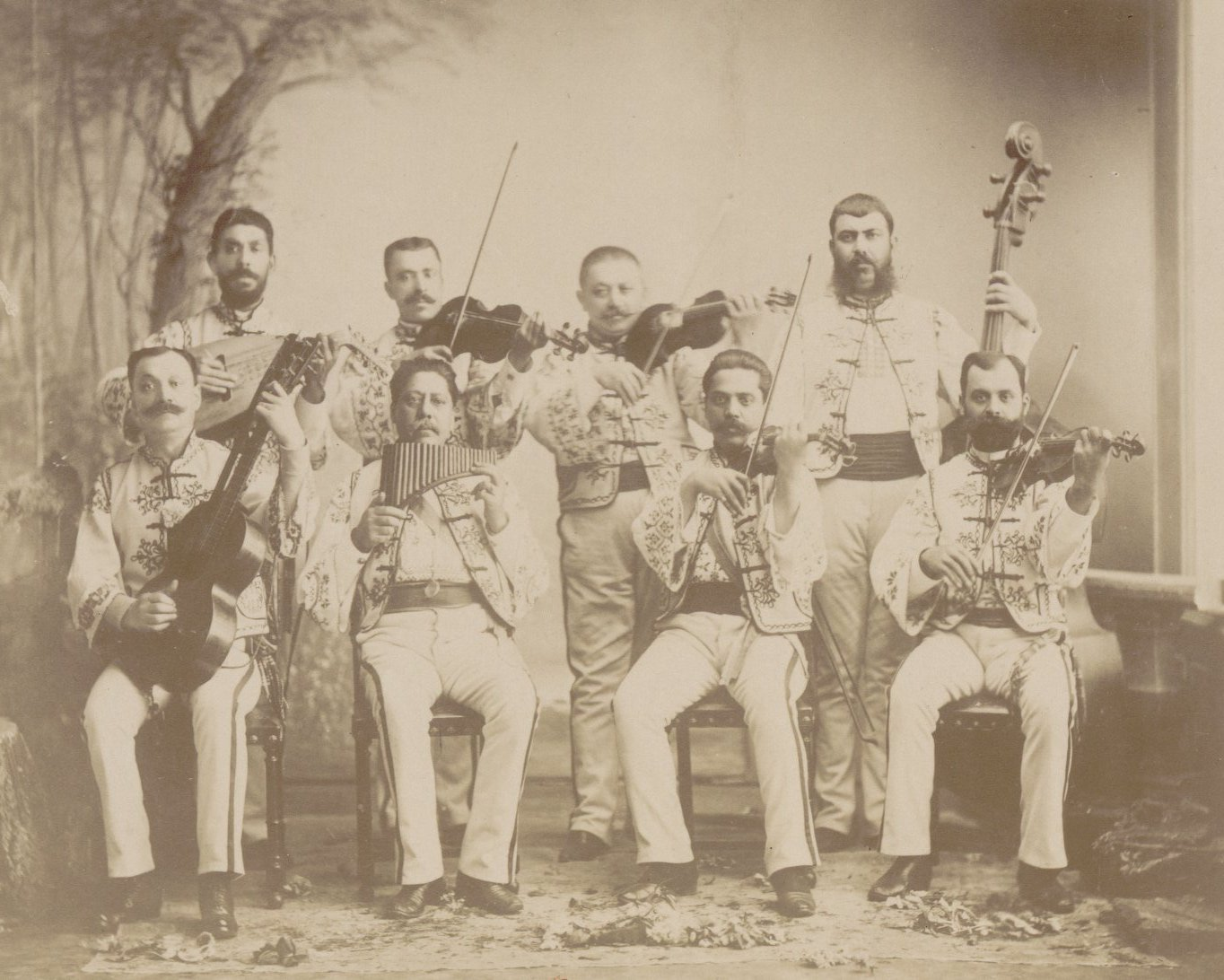
Exposition Universelle in Paris (1889). Dinicu taraf. Photograph: Nadar.

In 1889, lăutari Ionică Dinicu and Ionică's father Angheluș Dinicu – father and grandfather of the 20th-century musician Grigoraș Dinicu – performed at the 1889 Exposition Universelle in Paris. The program appears to have been chosen by the musicians themselves: pieces composed specially for the exhibition included "Sârba expoziției" ("Exhibition Sârba"), "Marșul național" ("National March"), and "Hora de concert" ("Concert Hora"). Also among the works performed was the nai melody "Ciocârlia" ("Skylark"), attributed to Angheluș Dinicu; in Grigoraș Dinicu's violin arrangement it became one of the symbols of lăutărească music. "Ciocârlia" remains a staple of lăutar violinists' repertoire, especially for foreign audiences.

A French reviewer in the Revue de l'Exposition Universelle de 1889 remarked on the musical abilities of Romanian Romani people: "highly gifted, they are almost instruments themselves" (French: Ces êtres, éminemment doués, sont presque des instruments eux-mêmes). Musicologist Annegret Fauser notes that the Hungarian Romani orchestras performing at the same exhibition were overshadowed by their Romanian counterparts, whose music struck the public as "even more authentic"; in Romania itself, some intellectuals objected to the country's being presented to Europe in an exotic and Orientalist light.

Violinist Sava Pădureanu (1848–1918), who performed at both the 1889 and 1900 Paris exhibitions, gained international recognition and toured Britain, Russia, and Monte Carlo. In 1908 he performed with his taraf at the Paris Palais des Beaux-Arts in the same concert as Eugène Ysaÿe. Romanian tarafs and orchestras were popular around the turn of the 20th century in Saint Petersburg and other cities of the Russian Empire; the orchestra of Romani pianist and violinist George Ochialbi accompanied Mathilde Kschessinska and Alfred Bekefi at a Saint Petersburg concert in 1899.

== Lăutar profession ==
Most lăutari are Romani, although the share of Romanian and other non-Romani musicians is higher in regions with strong local peasant music traditions. In the early 18th century, Dimitrie Cantemir wrote of Moldavian weddings that the local musicians invited to play "are scarcely ever not Gypsies" (Latin: musicos illius loci, qui vix alii nisi Cingari esse solent). In the late 20th century, ethnomusicologist Speranța Rădulescu estimated that about 80% of Romanian lăutari were Romani.

A lăutar is a professional who earns his living from music under an oral or written contract. Lăutari played at weddings, village dances, clacă, (Note: Clacă was voluntary collective work performed by peasants to help one another, often accompanied or followed by a small celebration, jokes, stories, and similar social activities. Cf. Communal work.) sâmbra oilor, (Note: Sâmbra oilor is a festival marking the start of sheep milking in the mountains.) taverns, and fairs. The client who made the contract could be the groom, the groom's father, the leader of a group of young men, the householder, or the tavern keeper. In the early 20th century contracts were overwhelmingly oral, because villages were largely illiterate. From the 1960s and 1970s written agreements became more common, and they eventually predominated.

- YouTube_social_white_circle_(2017) Traditional tarafs. Field recordings
- Muntenia
- Oltenia
- Moldova and Bukovina
- Maramureș
- Transylvania
- Oaș
- Bihor/Crișana

Lăutar music is a professional craft passed on orally. Musicians learn norms, performance techniques, and repertoire by ear, within the family or by working alongside an experienced master, not from written manuals. As part of folk culture, lăutar art rests on three principles. First, it is tied to community life: a lăutar plays for a particular ritual, celebration, or local repertoire, not out of creativity detached from everyday life. Second, it relies on variation: inherited melodies are never reproduced identically but are performed anew each time. Third, it is improvisational: the lăutar freely combines and transforms traditional means of expression rather than following a fixed model.

The craft's most important features follow from its economic basis. A lăutar depends on music for his livelihood, so his repertoire and style follow what clients want. To succeed, he must choose the genres and forms clients like best and adapt his repertoire and manner to each audience. Mixing styles is not seen as a fault, and offering commercially demanded genres has traditionally been a mark of professionalism; researchers call this "aesthetic conformism and eclecticism". Lăutari themselves regard this flexibility as a point of professional pride: a good musician knows how to "read" an audience and can play almost anything it asks for. The Romanian-French anthropologist Victor Stoichiță makes a similar observation: for lăutari, music is less a language of self-expression than a way of managing listeners' emotions and the course of a celebration.

=== Training and transmission of skills ===
Lăutar art is traditionally a male craft, passed down the male line: boys learn it by ear from their fathers and older relatives from an early age. When music is the family's main occupation, sons learn it so that they can help their father as soon as possible. Musicians' communities are not completely closed and can admit people from peasant or craft backgrounds, though newcomers usually train under less favorable conditions. There is no fixed age to begin. A child may show an interest in music at five to seven, systematic training more often starts at ten to twelve, and study of the violin, the most technically demanding instrument, often begins at fifteen to eighteen. Despite the late start, pupils generally reach a high technical level in a relatively short time. In lăutar families, the father chooses the instrument, taking into account his son's abilities, prevailing fashions, and his wish that his sons master different instruments and be able to form a "family taraf".

Training under a master is systematic, although lăutari themselves can rarely say coherently how they learned their instrument. Whatever the instrument, the pupil first learns posture, bowing technique, fingering, recognizing keys by ear, accompaniment formulas, and accompaniment itself; only then does he learn melodies. The teacher demonstrates a technique, leaves the pupil to practice it alone, and checks it at the next lesson. Learning rests on constant imitation and is sometimes accompanied by corporal punishment, which musicians later recall without resentment. Lessons are paid for in money or in kind, and are free when teacher and pupil are relatives. Self-teaching continues throughout a lăutar's career: he keeps picking up new melodies, accompaniment formulas, and technical devices from colleagues and, later, from stars of radio, television, and recordings. The final stage is a "baptism of fire" in a taraf at real celebrations. The pupil is first given simple accompaniment parts, then gradually replaces his master, and by about twenty can lead his own taraf.

Most lăutari play by ear. Only a minority can read music – about one in six, according to fieldwork from 1949–1965. Most of these are urban musicians who trained under masters with secondary or higher education, studied at a conservatory, or learned notation during military service in an orchestra. Lăutari who could read music were called "musicians" (Romanian: muzicanți), to distinguish them from lăutari who played by ear. Notation is needed mainly by the leaders of concert tarafs and folk orchestras, who must periodically update, arrange, and orchestrate repertoire. The scores these ensembles use are approximate: they record the general melodic and harmonic movement but leave out ornaments. Lăutar communities respect musicians who read notation and regard them as an elite.

=== The professional exchange and institutions ===
In the 20th century, the market for musical services was organized not by guilds, which had appeared in towns from 1723 onward, but by informal institutions. The most important was the "exchange" (Romanian: bursă). Urban lăutari met weekly at a place in the city center chosen by common agreement, and rural musicians had their own exchanges at weekly provincial fairs. There they traded information on which pieces and styles were "in demand", discussed rates, reputations, and the mistakes of absent colleagues, and waited for clients from the city and surrounding villages. Before hiring a musician, a client asked him to play, to check that his style suited. The exchange survived into the 21st century, although it lost its former importance.

Under the communist regime, lăutari were one of the few traditional professions that the state controlled only loosely: they practiced their craft in near market-economy conditions. Control came through local authorities and the Center for the Direction of Folk Art and Amateur Artistic Activity (Centrul de Îndrumare a Creației Populare și a Mișcării Artistice de Amatori). The Center periodically assessed freelance performers and assigned them qualification categories, using criteria such as the ability to perform solfège; the category set the maximum fee a musician could charge in restaurants. Administrative pressure also produced regional trade unions. Musicians paid dues, expecting little in return, and the unions fell apart after 1989. Clients who hired lăutari for weddings also paid a "composers' tax" to the Union of Composers, on the grounds that lăutari played Romanian popular music at celebrations.

The social position of lăutari improved markedly during the 20th century. In its second half, rural taraf musicians earned more and gained more public recognition than before, whatever their level of skill.

== Musical instruments ==
Most lăutărească instruments entered folk practice from pan-European or Eastern traditions; what makes them "lăutărească" is the performance style and ensemble context. The historical core of lăutar instrumentation consisted of the violin, nai, and cobza (and, in early ensembles, also the cimpoi), with the violin in the leading position. This combination is corroborated by foreign observers as well: the French historian Jean-Louis Carra, who visited Iași in 1775, described Romani musicians playing the violin, a "German guitar," and an "eight-mouthpiece whistle" – later identified as the cobza and the nai – (French: le violon, la guittare allemande, & un sifflet à huit embouchures), while William Wilkinson, the British consul in the principalities of Moldavia and Wallachia, named "the common violin, the Pan-pipe, and a kind of guitar or lute peculiar to the country" as the most typical instruments in 1820. From the late 19th century the instrumentation changed: the cobza was displaced by the cimbalom, while the accordion became important in the 20th century. In parallel, Western brass instruments entered Moldavian lăutărească music through military and urban orchestras.

=== Violin ===
Lăutar (Moldova, 1968). Photograph: Ion Chibzii.

The violin is the leading melodic instrument of lăutărească music. Unlike indigenous pastoral instruments, it entered folk practice from the wider European tradition and was fully assimilated by lăutari, who adapted it to local aesthetics: they imitated vocal intonation and the sound of older instruments such as the cimpoi and developed elaborate ornamentation.

Lăutari usually play factory-made instruments but often modify them: they alter the soundboard to obtain a less "wooden" sound and add sympathetic strings to enrich the timbre. Different ethnographic regions developed their own variants: the Transylvanian three-stringed accompanying violin braci, with a flat bridge allowing full triads to be played in one bow movement; a folk version of the Stroh violin with a metal horn (Romanian: vioară cu goarnă) in Bihor and Arad; and the high-tuned cetera of Oaș, whose strings are shifted one position toward the bass and whose bridge is heavily thinned to permit a tuning sometimes a perfect fifth above the classical one.

Lăutari often vary the pitch of the tuning according to regional practice, repertoire, and acoustic conditions, tuning the instrument a semitone or whole tone above or below the reference pitch. Beyond shifting the overall tuning, musicians widely use scordatura – altering the intervallic relationships between strings – to obtain a distinctive timbre through reduced string tension, to imitate other instruments, to facilitate double stops, or to play melodies in particular modes. Scordatura is used especially by older, experienced lăutari for archaic repertoire.

Instrument position and bowing differ noticeably from academic practice: the violin is usually held mainly with the left hand, without being tightly clamped between shoulder and chin. This leaves the player's chin and jaw free for singing and giving commands to dancers, but changes the work of the left hand: strings are often pressed with the flat part of the fingertips, producing a characteristic wide vibrato, while position changes are audible and shaped as expressive glissandos. Special techniques imitate other timbres: in the piece "Fusul" ("Spindle"), a horsehair is tied to the string near the bridge and rubbed with rosin-covered fingers to produce the squeaking sound of a spindle, while a small glass placed on the soundboard (păhărel) produces a nasal timbre.

=== Cobza ===
The cobza (Romanian: cobză) is a fretless plucked lute-type instrument with a pear-shaped body, short neck, and backward-bent pegbox. It usually has eight to twelve strings grouped into four courses, tuned in fourths and fifths (most often D–A–D–G), with the sound produced by a plectrum made from goose feather. Historically, the cobza was the principal accompanying instrument of lăutar ensembles in Moldavia and Muntenia in the 18th and 19th centuries and partly into the 20th; the famous head of the Iași lăutari, Barbu Lăutaru, played it. The cobza is not characteristic of Oltenia and Transylvania.

Its short fretless neck forces playing mainly in open positions, making elaborate melodic lines difficult and determining the instrument's accompanying role. The cobza creates the harmonic and rhythmic foundation through stable chord-rhythmic formulas known as Romanian: țiituri (from a ține hangul, "to keep accompaniment"), often built on a drone.

=== Cimbalom ===
In lăutărească practice, the cimbalom (Romanian: țambal) is primarily an accompanying instrument. During the second half of the 19th and early 20th centuries it became established in tarafs in place of the cobza. Alongside large cimbaloms on legs and with a mute pedal, lăutari use small portable cimbaloms placed on a table or carried on a shoulder strap, allowing them to play even while moving, for example in wedding processions. In Muntenia, cimbaloms began spreading from the end of the 19th century after small instruments appeared, whereas in western Moldavia they entered practice only in the 20th century.

The tuning of lăutar cimbaloms is not uniform. In Muntenia, "Hungarian" and "Romanian" tunings are distinguished: the differences mainly concern string placement and are not fundamental, although a musician accustomed to one system has difficulty switching to the other. In Bessarabia and Bukovina, the appearance of the cimbalom is associated with klezmorim, and its tuning differs from the Muntenian one. Accompaniment technique also varies by region: in Muntenia and Moldavia there are no special formulas for slow melodies, so doinas and songs acquire a "dance-like" character, whereas in Transylvania and Banat slow melodies are accompanied by arpeggios and sustained notes played with tremolo, as with Hungarian musicians.

=== Nai ===
Nai (Romanian: nai, a pan flute) formed part of the historical core of lăutar instrumentation alongside the violin and cobza. From the 18th century onward, documents record it in almost all lăutar ensembles of Muntenia and Moldavia. The number of pipes increased over time, from seven or eight in the 18th century to eighteen in Moldavia and twenty-three or more in Muntenia. The instrument was also known as moscal, muscal, and fluierar. From the second half of the 19th century, after reaching a peak, the nai began to disappear in Moldavia, where it practically fell out of use; in Wallachia it survived only residually – by the mid-20th century, only a few Bucharest lăutari and musicians in villages of Oltenia and Muntenia along the Olt river played it.

=== Accordion ===
In the 20th century, the accordion became established in the taraf. As a factory-made instrument, it entered Romanian folk practice together with jazz during the interwar period, gradually displacing earlier button accordions. The accordion increasingly appeared instead of small cimbaloms or alongside them and assumed the ensemble's harmonic-melodic function. Despite its high cost, its spread was encouraged by its clear, powerful sound and versatility: one performer could simultaneously play the melody, provide accompaniment, and even accompany his own singing.

=== Brass instruments ===
- YouTube_social_white_circle_(2017) Lăutărească wind ensembles
- Lăutărească brass bands from Moldova
- Taragot (Banat, Maramureș)

In Moldavia, brass instruments (Romanian: alame) play an important role: trumpets, trombones, euphoniums, and helicons. Many lăutari had served in military bands and adapted these instruments to folk music, forming rural brass bands – lăutărească fanfares (Romanian: fanfare lăutărești) – which became widespread at weddings and celebrations. They are characterized by a powerful delivery and a repertoire that, alongside fast dances, includes lyrical songs and local ritual melodies associated with weddings and funerals.

=== Taragot ===
In the lăutar milieu of Banat, the taragot (Romanian: taragot, torogoată; Hungarian: tárogató) became particularly popular. It is a wooden or metal reed instrument related to the straight soprano saxophone. It was developed by Budapest maker Vencel József Schunda and first presented at the 1900 Exposition Universelle in Paris. It was introduced to Banat by lăutar Luță Ioviță (Caraș-Severin County), who learned to play it around 1906–1909 in Szeged and Budapest, and it became one of the principal melodic instruments in Banat tarafs. Local makers also became known for producing taragots from maple wood.

=== Cello and double bass ===
The cello and double bass entered lăutărească practice relatively late and are used mainly for accompaniment, providing the low register and harmonic foundation of the ensemble. In some regions the cello entered tarafs earlier than the double bass. The cello is known under the local names cel, gordună, gordon, and broancă, while the double bass is called bas, gordună mare, broancă, or becheș. Folk variants of both instruments could differ from academic instruments in construction and playing technique. In Transylvania, the cello is sometimes used rhythmically by plucking the strings with the left hand – using fingers or a pencil-sized stick (piscalău) – and striking them with a wooden stick (bit) in the right hand.

=== Guitar ===
In urban music-making, the folk guitar appeared in the early 19th century and was adapted by lăutari: in their tarafs, the standard six-string guitar in conventional tuning partly replaced the cobza, serving exclusively for accompaniment. It also spread to a limited extent in rural settings, particularly in Oltenia, Maramureș, and Oaș, where two stable regional variants developed – both with fewer strings, special tunings, and accompaniment-oriented playing techniques: the cobza guitar in Oltenia (Romanian: chitară cobzită), which inherited the tuning, playing techniques, and repertoire of the lăutar cobza, and the zongora in Maramureș and Oaș.

=== Percussion instruments ===
Lăutărească practice included Eastern percussion instruments such as the double-headed davul (Romanian: daul) and goblet-shaped darbuka (darabukkî); from the 19th century they were increasingly replaced by the European bass drum (toba mare). In Moldavia, under the influence of military bands and jazz, a percussion set known as "jazz" (Romanian: jaz) developed in the 20th century: a bass drum with cymbals mounted on top (talgerele), sometimes supplemented by a snare drum.

== Taraf ==
Lăutar taraf at the Agricultural Exhibition. Chișinău. 1889. Photograph: Pavel Kondratsky.

The word taraf (of Turkic origin) was used in Muntenia and Moldavia. In modern folklore studies, the term is applied to professional lăutar ensembles regardless of their local names – Romanian: ceată, bandă, muzică, and later orchestră. A taraf is not only a performing ensemble but also part of the organization of festive life: in Muntenia and Oltenia, at weddings, village dances, and other celebrations, it takes on organizing and directing roles as well. A taraf structures its sound through a division of roles: a solo instrument, usually the violin, develops the melody, while the accompanying group maintains the rhythmic and harmonic "framework." Style is created in live performance rather than in a fixed "text" of the melody: musicians reconstruct it anew each time according to the situation, ensemble, and audience taste.

=== Composition and evolution ===
The composition of the taraf changed with period and region. Early lăutar ensembles used the violin, lăută (cobza), and drums; in the 18th and 19th centuries, violin, nai, and cobza became a stable combination in Moldavia and Muntenia, designated in lăutar terminology by the word Romanian: tacâm (from Turkish: takım, "group, detachment; set"). From the late 19th century, the cobza was displaced by the cimbalom in many places, and in the 20th century the accordion joined the ensemble and assumed the harmonic-melodic function.

A taraf usually contained four to seven or more musicians, divided between melodic and harmonic-rhythmic groups. Urban lăutari expanded their ensembles earlier and more readily, adding instruments associated with academic and entertainment music, whereas rural tarafs remained smaller and closer to the traditional core.

Regional differences are visible in field materials from the early 20th century. Before 1918, Béla Bartók found only duos in Transylvania and Banat: in Maramureș the violin was accompanied by the zongora, then still a two-string instrument producing a rhythmically attacked perfect fifth; in Banat the accompanying instrument was a primitive cello struck with a stick; only in one region, the Transylvanian Plain, was a violinist-ceteraș accompanied by a second violinist producing connected major chords. In the 1930s, Constantin Brăiloiu found more complete tarafs in central Transylvania, including the double bass (Romanian: gordon); by then, tarafs had become established throughout the country.

Many of these changes were driven by the search for an increasingly loud sound, demanded by growing communities and large celebrations: for example, the replacement of cobza by cimbalom and accordion. For the same reason, the fluier gave way to violin, clarinet, or trumpet; the violin to the horn violin, saxophone, or taragot; and the "small bass" (basul micuț, cello) to the ordinary double bass. When replacements no longer produced the required effect, the ensemble itself was enlarged, to seven or eight instruments, resulting either in excessive total fees or lower earnings for each musician.

From the late 1960s, electric amplification superseded this process, and lăutari regularly upgraded to more powerful equipment, treating it as a sign of professional prestige, prosperity, and "modernity." Its use was limited by the impracticality of using equipment during wedding processions and by power cuts. Amplification noticeably changed ensemble timbre, concealed performance flaws, enabled less-qualified musicians to compete successfully with older rural lăutari, and reduced the need for musicians. Tied to sockets and microphones, musicians also became physically and psychologically more distant from clients and increasingly allowed themselves to play without a specific request, introducing new styles to the celebration. At the same time terminology changed: Romanian: trupă and orchestră ("troupe" and "orchestra") began replacing taraf, ceată, and bandă, while Romanian: muzicant ("musician") partly replaced lăutar.

=== Establishment of the taraf in rural communities ===
Until the early 20th century, almost no tarafs were based in villages. Ensembles worked in market towns and at princely and boyar courts and were hired for inns, fairs, and church festivals; wealthier peasants engaged them only on special occasions, and not before the mid-19th century. The firm establishment of the taraf in rural communities resulted from several factors. Musicians who settled on the outskirts of towns and villages after emancipation began offering their services to fellow villagers, compensating for the lost boyar market. Rural communities grew, and their celebrations required louder music than that produced by the drâmba (a Romanian Jew's harp), a leaf (Note: Peasant musicians also improvised instruments from a tree leaf, a blade of grass, fish scales, or birch bark, held to the lips and blown to produce a sound.), the fluier, or the cimpoi. Processes of Europeanization affected Romanian society as a whole, including rural culture, and the taraf both reflected and accelerated them.

According to Speranța Rădulescu, the arrival of the taraf changed village festive music about as profoundly as amplification and electronic instruments would later do. The taraf "Westernized" rural festive sound on two levels: the overall timbral color created by the new instrumentation, and the accompaniment, which increasingly became tonal-harmonic. At the same time, improvisational genres developed vigorously: brâu melodies of Muntenia, dances of Oaș, învârtita of Maramureș, doinas and old ballads of the south, and cântec de dragoste ("love songs") of Muntenia and Oltenia. The advantage went to musicians whose technique and imagination had been sharpened professionally, while group improvisation opened possibilities unavailable to a solo musician. The taraf structured and consolidated the professional class of folk musicians, which eventually developed a code of professional conduct – rules governing relations with clients and the organization and restructuring of ensembles – that musicians followed throughout their lives and passed on as an inheritance.

The establishment of the taraf also had a reverse effect: it contributed to the decline of amateur peasant music-making. At the same time, villages with their own taraf produced better dancers and singers than those that hired outside lăutari – evidence, recognized by peasants themselves, that the taraf helped preserve performance traditions.

=== Hierarchy, roles, and texture ===
In most regions, the first violin, or Romanian: primaș, is the artistic leader of the ensemble: he carries the melody, improvises, introduces preludes and interludes, determines form and tempo, and signals changes of section to the others. The ensemble is divided into two functional groups – the melodic group (primaș, sometimes second violins or nai) and the accompanying group (cobza or cimbalom, later accordion, double bass, and drum) – and their interaction is coordinated live through the leader's gestures and signals. Signals are also given musically: before a song or a harmonic change, the primaș plays two or three two-note figures or simply names the tonic, establishing the key for the accompaniment. The primacy of the violin is not universal: in Moldavian fanfares and Banat tarafs, the leading melodic role may instead be taken by the trumpet and taragot respectively.

Accompaniment in a taraf is rarely a literal playing of chords. The accompanying group creates a stable rhythmic-harmonic foundation through repeated formulas (țiituri). The choice of a particular țiitură belongs to the primaș, who selects a formula suited to the piece and its tempo and gives it to the other musicians. In some styles the foundation rests on pedal points and ostinato figures; in others it "breathes" and responds to the primaș's improvisation. In either case it serves as a "sound platform" for melody and voice. The parts are not always strictly synchronized: accompanying voices may change harmony slightly after the first violin, creating characteristic tension in the ensemble sound.

=== Regional types of taraf ===
In Muntenia and Moldavia, the most widespread type was the string taraf based on violin with an accompanying group; cobza initially played an important role, later replaced by cimbalom in many ensembles, with accordion added in the 20th century. In Oltenia there were tarafs with violin and cobza guitar; the region was also distinguished by a developed tradition of violin scordatura. In Moldavia and Bukovina, the string ensemble could be joined by the fluier, serving a solo or ornamental function; lăutărească brass orchestras (fanfare) were also widespread there, as were mixed ensembles combining a string taraf with a wind group.

In Transylvania, a type of taraf developed with violin, three-stringed braci, and double bass. Braci and double bass provided accompaniment, while chord changes only approximately coincided with the violin melody, producing characteristic sonorities. Composer and musicologist György Ligeti regarded these discrepancies as a normal consequence of playing technique rather than performance errors. In Maramureș and Oaș, the cetera was accompanied by the zongora; in Oaș the cetera is characterized by an unusually high tuning. In Banat, the taragot acquired a prominent melodic role in the taraf.

== Musical language ==
Lăutărească music draws on several cultural traditions. As early as 1864, Nicolae Filimon named pastoral music, Byzantine church music, and Ottoman music among its sources; Western European music was added later. According to the American ethnomusicologist Robert Garfias, in the 19th and 20th centuries lăutari blended elements of the Turkish makam system (a system of melodic modes) with Western European major–minor harmony. The strict rules of the makams were gradually simplified and their traditional names fell out of use, but their characteristic modes and ways of shaping pitch remained in performance.

=== Rhythm ===
Dance music rests on a steady pulse kept by the accompaniment, but within that pulse lăutari freely "play with time": they speed up, hold back, and shift accents for expressive effect and to manage the dancers. Asymmetrical rhythms are widespread. Constantin Brăiloiu introduced the term aksak into ethnomusicology to describe them; examples are the seven-beat geamparale and the nine-beat cadînească, which keep their Turkish names. Even in dances with a basic two-beat meter, lăutari often divide the measure into internal groups, which creates a syncopated movement.

The slow, expressive hora (Romanian: țiitura de of) does not follow a strict two-beat meter. It uses irregular groupings of beats instead, from 5+4 to 11+9. Instrumental measurements show a stable ratio between long and short beats, in the range 0.73–0.80, which gives a "swaying" pulse that is hard to write in Western notation. (Note: Rădulescu and Beissinger describe Romanian: de of as a ten-beat formula internally divided 3+2+3+2.) Medium- and fast-tempo horas (Romanian: hora lăutărească or hora țigănească, "Gypsy hora") keep a clear two-beat pulse in the accompaniment. The melody and its rhythmic subdivision, however, often follow permutations of a 12-beat pattern. The resulting syncopation is compared by Garfias to rhythmic structures in some jazz genres.

The melody can thus stay fairly free against the measured pulse of the accompaniment, a manner that the musicologist Judit Frigyesi called "fluid rhythm". The doina shows this most clearly. Peasants perform it in free rhythm and without accompaniment. In a lăutar taraf, the solo line (violin or voice) keeps its rhythmic freedom while the ensemble holds a strict meter, usually at the tempo of a fast hora.

=== Mode, makam, and intonation ===
Much of the repertoire uses major and minor modes, but modal principles close to the makam system are also important. This Eastern layer is unevenly spread. It is most noticeable in the south – the Danubian Plain, Dobruja, and southern Moldavia – where Turkish cultural influence was strongest, while regions such as Transylvania remain mainly based on European major–minor tonality. In performance, the modes are heard as particular "pulls" between notes of the scale and characteristic melodic turns. In the recordings Garfias analyzed, the most frequent makams are Turkish: Hijaz, Nikriz, and Segah. Hijaz, which the Turkish tradition sometimes calls "Gypsy", is the most widespread. The makam models seem to have reached lăutari indirectly, through the Greek music of the Phanariot period, not directly from Turkish music: in Romanian towns of the 18th and 19th centuries, Greek music was more popular than Ottoman court music.

Lăutărească performance often uses non-tempered intonation: the pitch of individual notes varies and does not fit the fixed steps of the Western scale, which gives a microtonal effect. For example, in "Cântec la masă mare" as performed by the violinist Aurel Gore, the second note of the scale is consistently lowered by about two commas (very small pitch intervals), which matches the intonation typical of the makams Turkish: Dügah and Saba.

=== Ornamentation, variation, and improvisation ===
Variation and improvisation are central to lăutărească performance. The musician adjusts melodic formulas, rhythm, intonation, and ornamentation to the situation, the repertoire, and the audience's response. This is most visible in the part of the lead musician, usually the first violin, or primaș. He starts from a basic melodic formula, varies it with each repetition, and mixes stable turns with improvised passages. Ornamentation is more than decoration added to a finished melody: it helps shape and develop the melody itself. Lăutari call characteristic ornaments "little flowers" (Romanian: floricele). During a performance, the musician may change phrase lengths, introduce new turns, and vary rhythm and intonation while keeping the melody recognizable, and this ability is an important part of professional lăutar skill.

Singers of "listening" music (muzica de ascultare) each choose a vocal style that suits them. One is a powerful, sorrowful male chest voice interrupted by sobs, as in Ion Albeșteanu or Fărâmiță Lambru. Another alternates head voice and chest voice, with many melismas (several notes sung on one syllable) and plaintive accents, as in Romica Puceanu, Gabi Luncă, and Dona Dumitru Siminică. A third is a hoarse, hard, deliberately loosely controlled voice close to the style of rural lăutari. Singers also combine these freely. Each style echoes Middle Eastern vocal traditions, and what listeners value is the voice's expressiveness more than its natural beauty.

=== Regional and local styles ===
The general principles of lăutărească music are applied differently in different regions and by different performers. Style depends on local tradition, the makeup of the ensemble, and audience taste. The differences reflect each region's wider cultural setting. In the south, "music of the suburbs" (Romanian: muzica de mahala, cf. Mahalla) with a strongly Eastern color predominates; in Transylvania the style is close to café-chantant and colored by southern elements; in Banat it tends toward Serbian popular music.

Styles also differ between town and country. Rural lăutari stay closer to local peasant repertoire and playing styles, while urban musicians follow changing tastes and new genres. The boundary is fluid: the same musician may play in the local tradition at a village wedding and perform more modern or urban repertoire elsewhere. For Bessarabia and the modern Republic of Moldova, local styles are described less fully than for several regions of Romania, and much of the available material consists of individual essays.

== Repertoire ==
The lăutărească repertoire is varied. It grew out of rural and pastoral melodies, urban songs, and borrowings from Greek, Turkish, and the wider Balkan musical environment. Its historical core is largely rooted in rural folklore, but during the Phanariot period lăutari, who often performed in the Ottoman Empire, absorbed an Eastern layer. According to Tiberiu Alexandru, around 1800 the best violinists in Constantinople were considered Romanian Gypsies. Under Phanariot rule, singers from the Greek princes' courts and churches brought Oriental influences to Romanian music, and lăutari drew themes from church and Turkish music. Romanian love songs acquired Oriental inflections and ornaments, and urban romances became part of the repertoire. After European music entered the army and the Bucharest opera, lăutărească pieces took on a European character mixed with the Turkish. Between 1830 and 1858 the first two parts of a hora were often modeled on a waltz or mazurka and the finale on Oriental music, and Western dances such as the quadrille and the polka were added. Cultivated works in the "national" style were then taken up by lăutari and circulated so widely that their authors' names were often lost. The main layers of the repertoire are epic ballads, "listening" and "drinking" music, dance and wedding music, and fashionable popular genres.

The repertoire differed substantially between town and village. In villages, local dance and ritual genres predominated. In Wallachian towns, lăutărească music combined several layers: Romani lyrical songs; Romani music proper, which lăutari played at their own weddings and christenings for fellow musicians and their families; the legacy of earlier centuries, rich in Greek and Turkish elements but now given tonal-harmonic accompaniment; serenades that lovers commissioned from lăutari to be played beneath a window; and the dance music of the surrounding villages. Over time these layers fused into an independent urban genre, known from the mid-20th century as Gypsy lăutărească music (muzică lăutărească țigănească). Lăutari played it in taverns for the inhabitants of urban outskirts, which also gave it the name "music of the mahala". The genre took hold mainly in southern cities and did not take root in Transylvania, northern Moldavia, or parts of Banat.

The repertoire changed together with society and the settings of performance. In the interwar tavern, a private place where customers knew one another, small rural or suburban tarafs moved between tables and adapted the music to each guest's taste. In the socialist restaurant that replaced the tavern, lăutari stood on a small platform away from the tables and played tangos, waltzes, romances, "folklore", and drinking songs; in expensive central establishments they played café-chantant music. Urban restaurant lăutari were much more versatile than their interwar predecessors. Besides dance and vocal music, they played popular academic works: "Ave Maria" by Franz Schubert, a prelude from The Well-Tempered Clavier by Johann Sebastian Bach arranged for cimbalom, Eine kleine Nachtmusik by Wolfgang Amadeus Mozart, and excerpts from the operas Cavalleria rusticana, La traviata, and Carmen.

=== Wedding cycle ===
- Wedding music

The wedding is the main setting for lăutărească music, and playing for the wedding ritual became almost exclusively a lăutar occupation. Lăutari accompany the key stages of the ritual and choose the music for each: the ritual shaving of the groom, the bride's departure from her parents' home, the honoring of the wedding parents, the main feast, and the dancing. The taraf also directs the celebration. It sets its pace, brings the guests together in shared ritual actions, and moves them from "listening" music at the table to dancing.

A special genre belongs to the masa mare (the main wedding feast): the love song (Romanian: cântec de dragoste). Despite its name, it is not a song with love poetry but a separate musical category, defined by its melody. Its melody changes often, includes spoken-style recitative and occasional melismas (several notes sung on one syllable), and has a flexible form and an emotionally intense delivery. It is related in structure to the doina, but unlike the doina it is performed almost only at the wedding table. In some places it is a contest between the ensemble's singers, and male guests sometimes take part. Rădulescu regards it as a vocal-instrumental creation of the lăutari themselves, influenced to varying degrees by the musical styles of the Middle East.

The wedding repertoire also includes functional genres – marches and ritual melodies – which makes it one of the most varied layers of lăutărească practice.

=== Dance music ===
Dance music is the largest layer of the lăutărească repertoire. For at least the last two centuries, lăutari have been its main professional performers and keepers. Their dances include the hora, sârba, brâu, corăghească, bătută, and căluș, as well as dances with asymmetrical rhythms: geamparale, brează, rustem, and cadînească. Lăutari do not simply reproduce a fixed dance melody: the same dance type may be played at different tempos and given different melodic and rhythmic treatment. The lăutărească hora covers this whole range, from slow, expressive versions to fast dance ones. It also shows the genre's typical balance between a steady accompanying pulse and a more freely shaped melody.

=== Epic ballads ===
- Lăutărească ballads

The epic ballad (folk name Romanian: cântec bătrânesc, "old song") is one of the main genres of the lăutărească repertoire in southern Romania. Today it survives almost only in the villages of south-central Romania, where it is sung mainly at weddings. Guests usually request several ballads, and lăutari largely monopolize wedding entertainment. The music of rural lăutari became the almost exclusive repository of the old songs of the south, among them "Miorița", "Meșterul Manole", "Corbea", "Toma Alimoș", and "Soarele și Luna". The lăutari had inherited these songs from the medieval court repertoire. In the village, the taraf made them more rural: they were performed at the wedding feast in musical and poetic terms acceptable to villagers.

Peasants also sing ballads, without taraf accompaniment, in private settings or before small groups. The "classical" ballads, those Romanians usually regard as artistically exemplary, were all collected from lăutari. Archival collections show that in the second half of the 20th century the ballads of plowmen and shepherds were markedly less extensive and imaginative than those of professional musicians. Peasant singers of epic are mostly not professional musicians, and their style is less developed than that of the lăutari. In a comparison of six singers from Oltenia and Muntenia (four lăutari and two peasants), the lăutari's songs had longer sentences and longer vocal sections and were more elaborate and more tightly structured. The peasant singers were also generally good storytellers, but their approach to composition was less demanding.

In the ballad the lăutar acts as a musical storyteller. Performance usually opens with an improvised instrumental introduction – a taqsim (Romanian: taxîm) – which establishes the modal basis and emotional atmosphere of the narrative. The vocal part then alternates with extended instrumental interludes, while recitative alternates with virtuosic passages. The survival of the taqsim, a distinctly "Turkish" technique, is linked specifically to the performance of epic ballads. In the 20th century, ballads increasingly became a kind of oral chronicle – epic narratives of recent events known throughout the surrounding area. Even the latest of these songs followed narrative schemes inherited from earlier epic tradition.

=== Listening music and lyrical songs ===
- Urban lăutărească songs

Besides dance music, lăutari perform "listening" music (Romanian: muzica de ascultare), drinking songs (cântec de pahar), and doinas, which receive more elaborate melody and ornamentation among lăutari. The wedding-table love song (cântec de dragoste) belongs to the same circle. Lyrical "listening" songs are almost always sung in Romanian. Their texts are in trochaic octosyllabic verse (eight-syllable lines with alternating stress) with continuous rhyme, and they open with traditional formulas such as "Green leaf" (Romanian: Foaie verde). They speak of pain, unhappy love, poverty, separation, and the ever-present "enemy" (Romanian: dușman), in which researchers see the personification of centuries of discrimination. Only the figures of the mother and the children remain bright.

=== National arias ===
In the second half of the 19th century, urban lăutari created a distinctive instrumental genre, the "national arias" (Romanian: arii naționale). These were dance melodies and wordless songs based on urban and rural traditions, but with tonal harmony and "European" instrumentation. The genre emerged during a period of national revival and was seen as a unifying sound symbol of the young Romanian nation. Lăutari presented national arias at the 1889 and 1900 Expositions Universelles, and later at international exhibitions in Paris (1937) and New York (1939), where the Romanian authorities sent leading musicians to enliven the national pavilions.

== Borderline genres and mutual influences ==
=== Lăutărească music and klezmer ===
Ashkenazic klezmorim were active in Ottoman-ruled Moldavia by the early 18th century, and the musicians' guild, previously dominated by Roma lăutari, accepted many of them. Jewish and Christian musicians often became bilingual or trilingual, speaking Romanian, Greek, and Yiddish. In Bessarabia, where Jewish settlement in the towns grew after the Russian annexation, Jewish and Roma musicians sometimes formed combined ensembles. Their collaboration produced a mixed repertoire with two branches: Moldavian dance genres adapted for Jewish audiences, and Jewish genres adapted for Moldavian Christians. Composer and musicologist Mihail Poslușnicu mentions a guild of Jewish lăutari in Iași in 1835. Klezmorim incorporated Moldavian motifs into their core genres while retaining Romanian names for them – doina, horă, joc, sârbă, and bulgărească. Feldman and Goldin identify Moldavian music as the main non-Jewish source of the klezmer tradition. Conversely, Jewish dance melodies such as sher, freylekhs, and khosidl (Romanian: husin) entered the repertoire of lăutari in Bessarabia and Bukovina. According to writer and folklorist Nicolae Filimon, Jewish musicians introduced the cimbalom to the region, where it subsequently became a key accompanying instrument in lăutar tarafs in Moldavia. (Note: The author uses the term "canon" for the cimbalom, cf. qanun.) Cooperation between klezmorim and lăutari in Moldavia continued until the Second World War; with the mass emigration of Romanian Jews to Israel in the 1950s–1970s, this repertoire continued to be performed there by emigrant communities.

=== Manele ===
- Lăutărească manele

The term manea (Romanian: manea; plural manele) first appeared in Moldavian sources in the 1850s, denoting a slow, languid Turkish love song, presumably performed in free rhythm and interspersed with laments. Indirect evidence places the history of the genre further back: manele associated with Turkish music may have existed in the Romanian principalities as early as the mid-17th century. By the late 19th and early 20th centuries, manele were performed less frequently, and mainly by lăutari. Examples of lăutărească manele include "Șaraiman," "Ileană, Ileană" by Romica Puceanu, and "Maneaua" and "Mama mea e florăreasă" by Gabi Luncă.

In the mid-1960s, new manele appeared among Bucharest musicians, possibly influenced by the music of the Turkic population of Romanian Dobruja. They were characterized by rhythmic formulas of the çiftetelli, used in belly dance in Anatolia and the Balkans. The genre spread among Romani communities in southern Romania; after censorship was lifted in the early 1990s, it became popular throughout the country, and in the following decades developed its own star culture (Adrian "Copilul" Minune, Vali Vijelie, Florin Salam).

== Lăutărească music in the 20th century ==
In the 20th century, lăutărească music underwent profound changes, becoming accessible in recorded sound for the first time through the field recordings of Béla Bartók and Constantin Brăiloiu. Urban lăutărească music flourished from the interwar period through an aesthetic peak in the 1960s–1980s, even as state policy after 1944 subjected the tradition to increasing administrative and ideological control.

=== Status, censorship, and public image ===
The role of Romani people in Romanian folk music was publicly debated long before the communist period. In 1909, musicologist George Breazul advised folklore collectors to look for old lăutari, "preferably Romanians, not Gypsies." In the 1920s the issue became the subject of a press controversy. Some – most sharply the composer Sabin Drăgoi, citing Bartók and Zoltán Kodály – argued that lăutari accelerated the degradation of peasant music by introducing elements alien to the national tradition, indiscriminately gathered from available sources. Others, notably George Enescu, pointed out that Romani musicians also helped preserve older layers that peasants were abandoning. Constantin Brăiloiu did not openly enter the controversy, although he regarded the urban music of the outskirts as a source of compositional inspiration no less respectable than peasant music.

In the second half of the 20th century, the elite of Bucharest's urban lăutari became a privileged social group – "silk Gypsies" (Romanian: țigani de mătase) – and a visible part of cultural life; prominent performers regularly appeared on radio and television. Despite male dominance in the lăutar milieu, singers Romica Puceanu and Gabi Luncă occupied prominent positions during this period.

At the same time, state cultural institutions frequently called on lăutari. They were the main participants in celebrations held at rural houses of culture for state anniversaries, party congresses, and elections; unlike ordinary hiring, a summons from the authorities was unpaid and could not be refused. Musicians began to distinguish between repertoire intended for public performance and repertoire intended for a restricted circle.

From 1974, scholarly literature on lăutărească music stopped mentioning Romani people; during this period commissions monitored the "purity" of lăutărească music, and the view that Romani musicians "spoiled" Romanian folk music resurfaced. French musicologist Bernard Lortat-Jacob, who collaborated with Speranța Rădulescu, quotes her 1981 statement: "The Gypsies do not distort the Romanian music that you want to enshrine, they simply make it live!" (French: ...les Tsiganes n'altèrent pas la musique roumaine que vous voulez sanctuariser, ils la font tout simplement vivre!).

Urban lăutărească songs were removed from central restaurants as "inauthentic Romanian folklore" and continued to be heard only in taverns on city outskirts; the genre was excluded from radio. A few recordings by the state studio Electrecord and television footage from New Year programs in 1973 and 1975 survive, from periods when the regime made ideological concessions. Only in the 1980s did Electrecord receive permission to issue four or five lăutărească records a year in substantial pressings; their revenue was intended to cover the cost of issuing hundreds of records of state-promoted "authentic folklore," but lăutărească recordings sold noticeably better than the records they were meant to subsidize.

In the 1980s, the mixing of national and external musical elements again drew criticism, this time over the spread of dance music called "Banat" or "Serbian" music in Romania. It developed where Romanian and Yugoslav lăutari, who regularly crossed the border to play at neighbors' weddings, exchanged melodies, rhythms, and accompaniment techniques, combining Balkan melodic elements with the rhythm and harmony of pop and rock music; it was unconnected to manele, which developed in a different environment and on a different basis. The regime considered this ethnically indeterminate music a threat to "national specificity": it was excluded from broadcast and circulated through clandestinely recorded compact cassettes. In 1986, a newspaper campaign was launched at the direction of the propaganda department under the slogan "purification of folklore": lăutari were forbidden to perform "Serbian music" publicly, even at clients' insistence, while a departmental order authorized the militia to fine violators and confiscate their professional certificates. In practice, punishments were rare, but the threat remained constant.

=== Concert tarafs and folk orchestras ===
- Concert tarafs
- Muntenia
- Oltenia
- Moldova and Bukovina
- Maramureș
- Transylvania
- Oaș
- Banat
- Bihor/Crișana
- Dobruja
- Bessarabia

In the post-war period, concert tarafs appeared in Soviet Moldova, oriented toward stage performance rather than traditional customs and rituals. Such groups existed both independently and as parts of state concert institutions; their membership ranged from four or five musicians in small tarafs to seven to ten in larger ones, and the leader usually played violin or accordion. By the 1970s the style of concert tarafs had become more eclectic and the repertoire less connected with tradition: written arrangements and fixed scores limited improvisational freedom, while regional characteristics became less pronounced. A more developed form was the folk music orchestra, created in the 1960s and 1970s within state concert institutions: the number of musicians rose to 15–25, a fixed conductor's role appeared, most performers had academic training, and folk material was performed in a processed and stylized form, with rhythmic and structural elements often simplified. An example is the National Folk Music Orchestra "Lăutarii" of the Moldovan National Philharmonic.

During the same period, large orchestras were created in Romania on the Soviet model. The first was the Orchestra „Barbu Lăutaru”, established in 1949, which became a model for ensembles soon created throughout the country; between 1948 and 1952, similar "folk orchestras" appeared in other communist Balkan countries. "Barbu Lăutaru" brought together about forty instrumentalists – seven or eight times more than a large taraf of the period – and reproduced its division between solo and accompanying groups, but operated on different principles: the performance of both groups was carefully planned and constantly controlled.

The orchestra brought together leading musicians from across the country, especially from Muntenia. Placed under a conductor and required to perform repertoire from all regions, they standardized performance style, abandoned free melodic and ornamental reformulation, improvised harmonization, and rhythmic deviation from an assumed pulse, and rendered music from distant cultural areas only approximately. The orchestra's sound incorporated techniques borrowed from academic practice – violin tremolo and legato, frequent chordal connections, crescendo and diminuendo – with no equivalents in the playing of lăutar tarafs themselves. Musicians included Fănică Luca, Luță Ioviță, Victor Predescu, Nicu Stănescu, and Ionel Budișteanu, among others. Such orchestras helped preserve folk instruments such as the cobza and nai, but officially promoted music largely lost its improvisational character, and regional differences became less visible.

Officially, the orchestra performed from written scores. According to Rădulescu, this was largely a fiction: the musicians did not read notation but learned by ear a single version of the melody and accompaniment proposed to them – also orally – by the conductor, who alone used schematic notes. Despite official requirements, most never mastered musical notation.

== Decline and contemporary practice ==
In the second half of the 20th century, urbanization and globalization changed the way society lived, and lăutărească music was heard less often in its former contexts of celebration and ritual. Concerns about the disappearance of the tradition had long existed: in 1957, the lăutar Alexandru Cercel, about 150 of whose melodies were recorded by the Institute of Ethnography and Folklore "Constantin Brăiloiu", lamented that old songs were disappearing. By the end of the century the sense of decline had become more pronounced. In the liner notes to a 1993 audio cassette, Speranța Rădulescu wrote: "This cassette represents the first published recording dedicated to the music of Moldova's rural wind bands, captured at the beginning of their magnificent but inexorable decline." The crisis also affected the profession: in the impoverished 1990s, some sons of lăutari refused to continue their fathers' craft, and the decline lasted about a decade.

Since the early 1990s, a number of lăutari performers have become known outside Romania, including Taraf de Haïdouks and Fanfare Ciocărlia. Taraf de Haïdouks participated in several Western films and in 2002 received the BBC Radio 3 Award for World Music in the Europe–Middle East category.

In the 1990s the instrumentation of wedding ensembles also changed sharply. Synthesizers (Romanian: orgă) imitating the timbres of absent instruments, electric violins, and electric accordions came into use, while sound amplification raised performance volume to unprecedented levels. Virtuosity and dense ornamentation became priorities. Urban Romani genres also spread into Romanian villages: at weddings, guests danced for hours to manele and the lăutărească hora, often preferred over the traditional large hora.

Traditional lăutar tarafs preserved in Romania were nominated in 2020 for the Representative List of the Intangible Cultural Heritage of Humanity of UNESCO. In 2025, the art of playing the cobza in Romania and the Republic of Moldova was inscribed on the Representative List.

== Revivalism ==
Alongside the continuing tradition of the lăutari themselves, a separate revivalist movement began in the 1970s, led by performers from outside the lăutar profession who sought to recover older repertoire and performance styles. Singers Alexandru Mica and Tudor Gheorghe, using contacts with the authorities, obtained from the archive of the Bucharest Institute of Folklore recordings of ballads performed by major Romani lăutari of the mid-century – Alexandru Cercel, Lache Găzaru, and others – and performed them publicly, each adapting them to his own style. In the 1980s younger singers joined them, searching villages and sound archives for old rural melodies and imitating them in detail; unlike their predecessors, they specifically valued reproducing the original lăutărească performance style rather than adapting it. They regarded the first half of the 20th century as the period when folk musical culture flourished. In the 21st century, urban lăutărească music has been reconstructed by the early-music ensemble Anton Pann, the group Trei parale, musician and researcher Bogdan Simion, the Zicălașii ensemble in Romania, and Tudor Ungureanu and his Ștefan Vodă folk ensemble in Moldova.

== Research and documentation ==
Lăutărească music existed for a long time as an oral tradition; early documentation came mainly through musical publications and transcriptions, and only in the early 20th century did researchers move to field sound recording and later to systematic study of regional styles and ensemble practice.

=== 19th-century musical publications ===
Romanian writer, poet, composer, and folklorist Anton Pann, using Byzantine musical notation, notated a number of secular songs, including lăutărească songs, in the book Selected Poems or Secular Chants (1831, 1837). François Rouschitzki, a military bandmaster, published in Iași in 1834 the collection Oriental Music: 42 Moldavian, Wallachian, Greek, and Turkish Songs and Dances, containing mainly Romanian folk melodies, including lăutărească music, transcribed for piano. In 1852–1854, Polish composer and pianist Karol Mikuli became acquainted with the music of Bukovinian lăutar Nicolae Picu, leading to the publication of four books of piano transcriptions of lăutărească music. Musical notation made the lăutar repertoire more accessible, but this early transcription work had to adapt sound material to the logic of European musical notation, resulting in simplification of rhythm and intonation.

=== Field recording and ethnomusicology (20th–21st centuries) ===
Constantin Brăiloiu's expedition recording lăutari in the village of Drăguș, 1936.

In the first half of the 20th century, Romanian traditional music, including lăutărească music, was recorded by composer and folklorist Béla Bartók (1908–1917, on wax cylinders) and Romanian-Swiss ethnomusicologist Constantin Brăiloiu (1928–1943, on wax cylinders and gramophone records). Their collections are partly available online through ethnographic museums in Budapest and Geneva.

Bartók also transcribed lăutărească songs in his study of Romanian folk music of the Bihor comitat. In the second half of the 20th century, Speranța Rădulescu played a key role, combining field recording with analysis of ensemble practice and repertoire; she studied lăutărească music from the mid-1970s and published recordings documenting local styles and performance norms. Drawing on field recordings, American ethnomusicologist Robert Garfias described in 1981 the survival of elements of the Turkish makam system in lăutărească practice.

== Lăutărească music in culture ==
Lăutărească music influenced academic and popular culture through the borrowing of melodies and performance techniques and through enduring stage images of the virtuoso lăutar.

=== Academic music ===
Several works by Béla Bartók demonstrate the influence of Romanian lăutărească music, including Romanian Folk Dances and Rhapsody No. 1 for Violin and Piano. Romanian-French composer George Enescu used several lăutărească melodies in his Romanian Rhapsody No. 1 (1901), including "Mugur, mugur, mugurel", published by Anton Pann in 1837, and "Ciocârlia" by Angheluș Dinicu.

=== Literature and cultural memory ===
- Alexandru Mica – Arde-mă, frige-mă! "Burn me, torch me"
- Dona Dumitru Siminică – La șalul cel negru "The Black Shawl"

Alexander Pushkin lived in Chișinău for several years, and evenings with lăutari were part of his life. According to V. P. Gorchakov, he was especially taken with the Moldavian song “Arde-mă, frige-mă” (“Burn me, torch me”) and reworked it as a song in ‘’The Gypsies’’; the melody was published in 1825. Vladimir Nabokov traced the words of the song through Prosper Mérimée’s French translation of the poem to the text of ‘’Carmen’’ (French: Coupe-moi, brûle-moi…).

Nabokov also noted that Pushkin's so-called Moldavian song "The Black Shawl" was translated into Romanian by Moldavian poet Constantin Negruzzi in 1837 and became a "folk song"; in the performance of Romani singer Dona Dumitru Siminică it became one of the emblematic compositions of lăutărească music.

=== Cinema ===
Lăutărească culture is represented in feature films. In 1973, Emil Loteanu portrayed the violinist and taraf leader Toma Alistar in the film Lăutarii, played by violinist and conductor Serghei Lunchevici. Since the 1990s, lăutărească music has also entered international cinema, where it often functions as a sign of a "Balkan" or "Eastern European" cultural space. The ensemble Taraf de Haïdouks appeared in several Western films, including Latcho Drom (1993) by Tony Gatlif and The Man Who Cried (2000) by Sally Potter. Romanian lăutărească and Romani music is also heard in another Gatlif film, Gadjo dilo (1997).

== Discography ==
Lăutărească music is represented in numerous commercial releases issued both in Romania and abroad. Among the best-known are:

- Taraful Tradițional Românesc (1982–1984, Electrecord, 6 LPs) – recordings of traditional Romanian tarafs, accompanied by explanatory notes in English, French, and Romanian.
- Roumanie: Musique des Tsiganes de Valachie. Les lautari de Clejani (1988, Paris, Ocora, C559036, CD).
- Roumanie: musique de village: Olténie, Moldavie, Transylvanie (1988, VDE-Gallo Records, 537–539, 3 CDs) – recordings of Romanian folk music made by Brăiloiu in the 1930s and 1940s, with a preface by Laurent Aubert and commentary by Speranța Rădulescu.
- The disc collection of Ethnophonie (Bucharest), specializing in lăutărească music (more than 30 CDs).
  - The first ten discs received the Coup de cœur award of the Académie Charles Cros (2005); the 12th disc received the Schallplatten Kritik award (2007).
- Taraful Bucurestilor. La musique des läutari tsiganes de Bucarest (2020, Paris, Maison des cultures du monde, CD); Coup de cœur award of the Académie Charles Cros (2020).

== Notes ==
Comments

== Sources ==
- Carra, Jean-Louis (1781). Histoire de la Moldavie et la Valachie [History of Moldavia and Wallachia] (in French) (Nouvelle édition ed.). Neuchâtel: Société typographique de Neuchâtel.
- Wilkinson, William (1820). An Account of the Principalities of Wallachia and Moldavia. London: Longman.
- Pushkin, Alexander (1825). "Staryy muzh, groznyy muzh…" Старый муж, грозный муж… [An old husband, a stern husband…]. Moscow Telegraph (in Russian) (21). Moscow.
- Pann, Anton (1831). Poezii deosebite sau Cântece de lume [Exceptional poems or Secular songs] (in Romanian). București.
- Rouschitzki, François (1834). Musique orientale: 42 Chansons et Danses Moldaves, Valaques, Grecs et Turcs [Oriental music: 42 Moldavian, Wallachian, Greek, and Turkish songs and dances] (in French). Iași: Tipografia Institutului Albinei.
- Pann, Anton (1837). Poezii deosebite sau Cântece de lume [Exceptional poems or Secular songs] (in Romanian) (2nd ed.). București.
- Mikuli, Charles (c. 1855). Douze airs nationaux roumains. Ballades, chants de bergers, airs de danse etc. Recueillis et transcrits pour le piano [Twelve Romanian national airs. Ballads, shepherd songs, dance tunes, etc. Collected and transcribed for the piano] (in French).
- Liszt, Franz (1859). Des Bohémiens et de leur musique en Hongrie [On the gypsies and their music in Hungary] (in French). Paris: Librairie Nouvelle.
- Karl (28 November 1874). "Vrais Tsiganes" [Real Gypsies]. La Vie Parisienne (in French) (48). Paris: 673–674.
- Burada, Teodor T. (1888-03-01). "Cronica muzicală a orașului Iași" [The musical chronicle of the city of Iași]. Convorbiri Literare (in Romanian). Iași: 1061–1101.
- Montégut, Maurice (1889-08-01). "La musique dans les cafés" [Music in cafés]. Revue de l’Exposition Universelle de 1889 (in French). 2.
- Rudolf, Kronprinz, ed. (1899). Die österreichisch-ungarische Monarchie in Wort und Bild. Bukowina [The Austro-Hungarian monarchy in word and picture. Bukovina] (in German). Vol. 20. Wien: Die kaiserlich-königliche Hof- und Staatsdruckerei.
- Bartók, Béla (1913). Cântece poporale româneşti din comitatul Bihor (Ungaria) [Romanian folk songs from Bihor County (Hungary)] (in Romanian). Bucureşti: Socec & comp. şi C. Sfetea.
- Lovinescu, Eugen (1913). Costache Negruzzi. Viaţa şi opera lui [Costache Negruzzi: His life and work] (in Romanian). Bucureşti: Editura Institutului de Arte grafice „Minerva”.
- Posluşnicu, Mihail Gr. (1928). Istoria musicei la români [The history of Romanian music] (in Romanian). București: Cartea Românească.
- Brăiloiu, Constantin (1951). "Le rythme Aksak". Revue de Musicologie (in French). 33 (99/100) (published December 1951): 71–108.
- Ligeti, György (1953). Szabolcsi, Bence; Bartha, Dénes (eds.). "Egy Aradmegyei román együttes" [A Romanian group from Arad County]. Emlékkönyv Kodály Zoltán 70. Születésnapjára (in Hungarian). Budapest: Akadémiai Kiadó: 399–404.
- Pann, Anton (1955). Ciobanu, Gheorghe (ed.). Cântece de lume [Songs of the world] (in Romanian). București: Editura de Stat pentru Literatură și Artă.
- Alexandru, Tiberiu (1956). Instrumentele muzicale ale poporului romîn [The musical instruments of the Romanian people] (in Romanian). Bucureşti: Editura de stat pentru literatură şi artă.
- Pushkin, Aleksandr (1964). Nabokov, Vladimir (ed.). Eugene Onegin. Vol. 3. New York: Bollingen Foundation.
- Ciobanu, Gheorghe (1969). Lăutarii din Clejani [The lăutari from Clejani] (in Romanian). București: Editura Muzicală.
- Gorchakov, V. P. (1974). Vospominaniye o Pushkine Воспоминание о Пушкине [A memory of Pushkin]. А. С. Пушкин в воспоминаниях современников (in Russian). Vol. 1. Moscow: Khudozhestvennaya Literatura.
- Bartók, Béla (1975). Suchoff, Benjamin (ed.). Rumanian Folk Music. Maramureș County. Vol. 5. The Hague: Martinus Nijhoff. doi:10.1007/978-94-010-1686-5. ISBN 978-94-010-1688-9.
- Alexandru, Tiberiu (1975). Muzica populară românească [Romanian folk music] (in Romanian). București: Editura Muzicală.
- Alexandru, Tiberiu (1978). "Vioara ca instrument muzical popular" [The violin as a folk musical instrument]. Folcloristică, Organologie, Muzicologie: Studii (in Romanian). 1. Bucureşti: Editura muzicală: 197–238.
- Alexandru, Tiberiu (1980a). Romanian Folk Music. Bucharest: Musical Publishing House.
- Alexandru, Tiberiu (1980b). "Vechi relaţii muzicale între Ţările Româneşti şi Orientul Apropiat" [Long-standing musical relations between the Romanian Principalities and the Middle East]. Folcloristică, Organologie, Muzicologie: Studii (in Romanian). 2. Bucureşti: Editura muzicală: 252–275.
- Kotlyarov, B. Ya., ed. (1981). Narodnyye pesni i tantsy v zapisi F. Ruzhitskogo Народные песни и танцы в записи Ф. Ружицкого [Folk songs and dances recorded by F. Rouschitzki] (in Russian). Chișinău: Literatura artistică.
- Garfias, Robert (1981). "Survivals of Turkish Characteristics in Romanian Musica Lautareasca". Yearbook for Traditional Music. 13: 97–107.
- Georgescu, Corneliu Dan (1984). Jocul popular românesc. Tipologie muzicală și corpus de melodii instrumentale [Romanian folk dance: Musical typology and corpus of instrumental melodies] (in Romanian). București: Editura muzicală.
- Rădulescu, Speranța (1984). Taraful şi acompaniamentul armonic în muzica de joc [The taraf and harmonic accompaniment in dance music]. Colecția națională de folclor (in Romanian). București: Editura Muzicală.
- Rădulescu, Speranţa (1988). "La formation du lăutar roumain" [The formation of Romanian lăutar]. Cahiers de musiques traditionnelles (in French) (1). Ateliers d'ethnomusicologie: 87–99.
- Beissinger, Margaret Hiebert (1988). "Text and Music in Romanian Oral Epic". Oral Tradition. 3 (3): 294–314.
- Kotlyarov, B. Ya. (1989). Moldavskiye leutary i ikh iskusstvo Молдавские лэутары и их искусство [Moldovan lăutari and their art] (in Russian). Moscow: Sovetsky kompozitor.
- Goldin, Max (1989). Rothstein, Robert A. (ed.). On Musical Connections Between Jews and the Neighboring Peoples of Eastern and Western Europe. Amherst: University of Massachusetts.
- Feldman, Walter Z. (1994). "Bulgareasca/Bulgarish/Bulgar: The Transformation of a Klezmer Dance Genre". Ethnomusicology. 38 (1). University of Illinois Press: 1–35.
- Cosma, Viorel (1996). Lăutarii de ieri şi de azi [Lăutari of yesterday and today]. Colecţia Destine (in Romanian) (2nd ed., rev. and expanded ed.). Bucureşti: Editura DU Style. ISBN 978-973-9246-05-7.
- Rădulescu, Speranța (1996). "Gypsy Music versus the Music of Others" (PDF). Martor (The Museum of the Romanian Peasant Anthropology Journal). 1. București: 134–145.
- Rădulescu, Speranța (December 1997). "Traditional Musics and Ethnomusicology: Under Political Pressure: The Romanian Case". Anthropology Today. 13 (6). Royal Anthropological Institute of Great Britain and Ireland: 8–12.
- Sadie, Stanley; Tyrrell, John, eds. (2001a). "Romania, III. Traditional music". The New Grove Dictionary of Music and Musicians. Vol. 21 (2nd ed.). New York: Oxford University Press. ISBN 978-0-19-517067-2.
- Sadie, Stanley; Tyrrell, John, eds. (2001b). "Transcription". The New Grove Dictionary of Music and Musicians. Vol. 25 (2nd ed.). New York: Oxford University Press. ISBN 978-0-19-517067-2.
- Bouët, Jacques; Lortat-Jacob, Bernard; Rǎdulescu, Speranța (2002). À tue-tête: Chant et violon au Pays de l’Oach, Roumanie [At the top of one’s voice: Singing and violin in the Oaș region, Romania] (in French). Nanterre: Société d’Ethnologie. ISBN 2-901161-66-9.
- Beissinger, Margaret H. (2007). Buchanan, Donna A. (ed.). "Muzică Orientală: Identity and Popular Culture in Postcommunist Romania". Balkan Popular Culture and the Ottoman Ecumene. Music, Image, and Regional Political Discourse. Lanham: The Scarecrow Press, Inc.: 95–141. ISBN 978-0-8108-6021-6.
- Filimon, Nicolae (2008). Paşca, Eugenia Maria; Ionescu, Vasile (eds.). "Lăutarii şi compoziţiunile lor (1864)" [The lăutari and their compositions (1864)]. Rromii în muzica românească. Antologie de texte şi sinteze (in Romanian). Iaşi: Artes: 125–128. ISBN 978-973-8263-22-2.
- Breazul, George (2008). Paşca, Eugenia Maria; Ionescu, Vasile (eds.). "Lăutarii (1966)" [Lăutari (1966)]. Rromii în muzica românească. Antologie de texte şi sinteze (in Romanian). Iaşi: Artes: 176–203. ISBN 978-973-8263-22-2.
- Chiseliţă, Vasile (2008). "Interferenţe culturale evreieşti în muzica traditională de dans din Basarabia şi Bucovina" [Jewish cultural influences in the traditional dance music of Bessarabia and Bukovina]. Anuarul Institutului de Etnografie şi Folclor “Constantin Brăiloiu” (in Romanian). 19. Bucureşti: Editura Academiei Române: 201–222.
- Chiseliță, Vasile (2009a). "Fenomenul lăutăriei și tradiția instrumentală" [The lăutari phenomenon and the instrumental tradition]. Arta muzicală a Moldovei. Istorie și modernitate (in Romanian). Chișinău: Grafema Libris: 73–99. ISBN 978-9975-52-046-1.
- Chiseliță, Vasile (2009b). "Repertoriul muzical păstoresc" [Pastoral musical repertoire]. Arta muzicală a Moldovei. Istorie și modernitate (in Romanian). Chișinău: Grafema Libris: 235–272. ISBN 978-9975-52-046-1.
- Bunea, Diana (2010). "Tradiția lăutărească din Republica Moldova: Istorie și contemporaneitate. Teze preliminarii" [The lăutari tradition in the Republic of Moldova: History and contemporaneity. Preliminary theses]. RevART (in Romanian) (1). Timișoara: Aegis: 25–38.
- Giurchescu, Anca; Rădulescu, Speranţa (2011). "Music, Dance, and Behaviour in a New Form of Expressive Culture: The Romanian Manea". Yearbook for Traditional Music. 43: 1–36.
- Cantemir, Dimitrie (2011) [1716]. Sukhachev, N. L. (ed.). Descriptio Moldaviae [Description of Moldavia] (in Latin). Saint Petersburg: Nestor-Istoria. ISBN 978-5-905-986-21-5.
- Buzilă, Varvara (2011). Costumul popular din Republica Moldova [The folk costume of the Republic of Moldova] (in Romanian). Chişinău: UNESCO.
- Rădulescu, Speranţa (2015). Taifasuri despre muzica ţigănească [Conversations about Gypsy music] (in Romanian). București: Paideia. ISBN 978-606-748-073-3.
- Feldman, Walter Z. (2016). Klezmer: music, history and memory. New York: Oxford University Press. ISBN 978-0-19-024451-4.
- Giurchescu, Anca; Rădulescu, Speranţa (2016). Beissinger, Margaret H.; Rădulescu, Speranța; Giurchescu, Anca (eds.). "Music, Dance, Performance: A Descriptive Analysis of Manele". Manele in Romania: Cultural Expression and Social Meaning in Balkan Popular Music. Lanham: Rowman & Littlefield: 1–44. ISBN 978-1-4422-6708-4.
- Beissinger, Margaret H. (2016). Beissinger, Margaret H.; Rădulescu, Speranța; Giurchescu, Anca (eds.). "Village Manele: An Urban Genre in Rural Romania". Manele in Romania: Cultural Expression and Social Meaning in Balkan Popular Music. Lanham: Rowman & Littlefield: 205–245. ISBN 978-1-4422-6708-4.
- Shabunina, O. M. (2018). "Velikorusskiye orkestry i baletnoye iskusstvo na rubezhe XIX–XX vv.: tvorcheskiye kontakty i sovmestnyye nachinaniya" Великорусские оркестры и балетное искусство на рубеже XIX–XX вв.: творческие контакты и совместные начинания [Great Russian orchestras and the art of ballet at the turn of the 20th century: Creative contacts and joint initiatives] (PDF). Voprosy teatra. Proscaenium (in Russian) (3–4): 276–287.
- Pávai, István (2020). Hungarian Folk Dance Music of Transylvania. Budapest: MMA Kiadó. ISBN 978-615-5927-14-0.
- Feldman, Walter Z. (2020). "Klezmer Tunes for the Christian Bride: The Interface of Jewish and Romanian Expressive Cultures in the Wedding Table Repertoire from Northern Bessarabia". Revista de etnografie și folclor (1–2). București: Editura Academiei române: 5–35.
- Rădulescu, Speranța (2022). Pavel, Benedicta; Moisil, Costin (eds.). Peisaje muzicale în România secolului XX [Musical landscapes in 20th-century Romania] (in Romanian) (2nd ed., revised ed.). București: Editura Universității Naționale de Muzică București. ISBN 978-606-659-137-9.
- Lortat-Jacob, Bernard; Aubert, Laurent (2022). "Deux hommages à Speranța Rădulescu (1949–2022)" [Two tributes to Speranța Rădulescu (1949–2022)]. Cahiers d'ethnomusicologie (in French) (35). Ateliers d'ethnomusicologie: 277–286.
- Stoichiță, Victor A. (2022). "To Bark or Not to Bark? On Familiarity, "Field", and Speranţa Rădulescu's Recordings". Musicology Today. 13 (3 (51)): 225–242.
- Beissinger, Margaret H. (2023). "Ultimele cântece bătrânești din Olt / Last Old Songs From Olt. Review". Music & Minorities. 2: 1–7. doi:10.52413/mm.2023.17. ISSN 2791-4569.
- Beissinger, Margaret H. (2024). "Songs of Pain: Muzica Lăutărească and the Voices of Romica Puceanu and Gabi Luncă". Music & Minorities. 3: 1–26. doi:10.52413/mm.2024.33.
- Rădulescu, Speranța; Beissinger, Margaret H. (2025). Beissinger, Margaret H. (ed.). "The Music of Urban Lautari in Southern Romania". The Oxford Handbook of Slavic and East European Folklore. New York: Oxford University Press: 817–844. doi:10.1093/oxfordhb/9780190080778.001.0001. ISBN 978-0-19-008077-8.
- Iordan, Florin (2025). Baker, Catherine (ed.). "Reviving nineteenth-century Wallachian and Moldavian urban music". The Routledge Handbook of Popular Music and Politics of the Balkans. London – New York: Routledge: 105–115. ISBN 978-1-003-32816-2.
