= Lăutari =

Professional Romani musicians

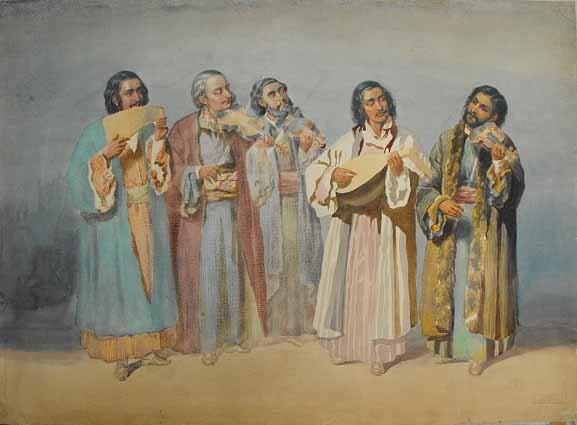
Lăutari in the 19th century

The Romanian word lăutar (pronounced [lə.uˈtar]; plural: lăutari) denotes a class of musicians.

The term was adopted by members of a professional clan of Romani musicians in the late 18th century. The term is derived from lăută, the Romanian word for lute. Lăutari usually perform in bands, called taraf.

== Terminology ==
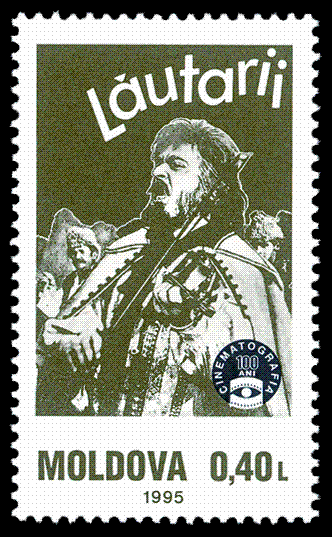
Lăutarii, a 1995 Moldovan stamp

Lăutar, according to the DEX ("Dicționarul Explicativ al Limbii Române" — "The Explanatory Dictionary of the Romanian Language"), is formed from lăută (meaning "lute") and the agent suffix -ar, common for occupational names. Originally, the word was used only for the peasant Romanian musicians who played the lăută. A distinction should be made between the generic Romanian-language word lăutar and the Romani clan. The others were named after their instruments, too, e.g.: scripcar (scripcă player), cobzar (cobza player), and naingiu (nai/panflute player). From the 17th century, the word lăutar was used regardless of the instrument that was played.

== History ==
The first mention of lăutari is from 1558 when Mircea Ciobanul (appointed ruler by the Ottomans in January 1545), the Voivode of Wallachia, gives Ruste lăutarul (Ruste the lăutar) as a gift to the Vornic Dingă from Moldavia. In 1775 the first lăutărească guild (breaslă), was established in Wallachia.

The lăutari were both slave Roma and serfdom Romanians, but the Roma were the majority. Through time there have also been Jewish and Turkish lăutari.

Before the 19th century, Romani musicians were often employed to provide entertainment in the courts of the Princes and Boyars. In the 19th century, most of these musicians settled in rural areas where they sought new employment at weddings, funerals, and other traditional Romanian celebrations. They were called țigani vătrași and have the Romanian language as their mother language, or sometimes the Hungarian language. Only a few of them, with ancestors from the kalderash or from the ursari groups, still spoke the Romani language.

The lăutari existed mainly in the Moldova, Muntenia, Oltenia and Dobruja regions of present-day Romania. In Transylvania, traditional professional musicians didn't exist until the 19th century. For this reason the peasant music of Transylvania remained more "pure". A similar situation was in Banat. Today the Romani lăutari are also predominant in Transylvania.

As performers, lăutari are usually loosely organized into a group known as a Taraf, which often consists largely of the males of an extended family. (There are female lăutari, mostly vocalists, but they are far outnumbered by the men.) Each taraf is led by a primaș, a primary soloist.

Traditionally, the lăutari played by ear, but today more and more lăutari have musical studies and can read notes.

The lăutari consider themselves to be the elite of the Roma. For this reason the lăutari want their children to marry only other lăutari.

A prominent researcher of lăutărească music and the lăutari, Speranța Rădulescu was a Romanian ethnomusicologist often referred to as the "mother of the lăutari."

== Lăutărească music ==
The music of the lăutari is called muzica lăutărească. There is not a single music style of the lăutari, the music style varies from region to region, the best known being that from southern Romania. The lăutărească music is complex and elaborated, with dense harmonies and refined ornamentations, and its execution requires a good technique.

The lăutari drew inspiration from all the musics they had contact with: the pastoral music of Romania, the Byzantine music played in the church, as well as foreign music, such as Western European.

Improvisation is an important part of the lăutărească music. Each time a lăutar plays a melody he re-interprets it. For this reason the lăutărească music has been compared to Jazz music. A lăutar from the Damian Draghici band, who also played Jazz, said that the lăutărească music is a kind of Jazz.

The music of the lăutari establishes the structure of the elaborate Romanian peasant weddings, as well as providing entertainment (not only music, but magic tricks, stories, bear training, etc.) during the less eventful parts of the ritual. The lăutari also function as guides through the wedding rituals and moderate any conflicts that may arise during what can be a long, alcohol-fuelled party. Over a period of nearly 48 hours, this can be very physically strenuous.

The repertoire of the lăutari include hora, sârba, brâul (a high tempo hora), doiul, tunes with Turkish derived rhythms (geamparaua, breaza, rustemul, maneaua lăutărească, cadâneasca), doina, de ascultare (roughly "song for listening", it can be considered a more complex form of doina), cântecul bătranesc, călușul, ardeleana, corăgheasca, bătuta.

In southern Romania, the lăutărească music has a rural stratum and an urban one.

Following custom almost certainly dating back at least to the Middle Ages, most lăutari rapidly spend the fees from these wedding ceremonies on extended banquets for their friends and families over the days immediately following the wedding.

== Instruments often played by lăutari ==
- pan flute (called "muscal" then "nai" in Romanian) – One of the primary instruments of old lăutari, it is seldom used today.
- Romanian folk violin – Always popular among lăutari.
- contra violin - Wider and deeper than a violin.
- double bass – Though often present in the taraf, the bass didn't receive much attention from the lăutari, because it didn't allow for "mărunt" (virtuosic) playing.
- cobza/lăuta – An instrument similar to the lute, but probably not directly related. It is either a direct descendant of the oud, brought by Romani musicians, or it is derived from the Ukrainian kobza. Like the kobza, it has a short neck and is used primary for rhythmic accompaniment, but, like the oud, it has no frets. Today it is virtually extinct.
- cimbalom (called "țambal" in Romanian) – It replaced the cobza/lăuta, having more capabilities.
- accordion – Very popular in the modern lăutarească music.
- clarinet – Used especially in southern urban lăutarească music.
- tárogató ("taragot" in Romanian) – Used especially in Banat, though today the saxophone has largely replaced the tárogató.
- brass instruments – An Austrian influence, used especially in Moldavia.

The lăutari rarely used the blown instruments used in the peasant music, because of their limited capabilities, but there were some lăutari who used the flute ("fluier") or the bagpipe ("cimpoi")

Today, the lăutari also used a lot of electric, electronic, and electroacoustic instruments: various keyboards (electronic accordions included), electric and electroacoustic guitars and basses, etc.

== List of well-known musicians/bands that play lăutari music ==
=== Bands / tarafs ===
Most tarafs do not have a specific name but are built around a person (the primaș) or a family. Most bands that have a name are commercially created. Some examples are:

- Damian and brothers – A band created by pan-flutist Damian Drăghici
- Fanfare Ciocărlia
- Mahala Rai Banda
- Taraf de Haïdouks

=== Musicians ===
- Ion Albeșteanu – violinist and singer
- Barbu Lăutaru (Vasile Barbu) – legendary cobza player from the 18–19th century
- Marcel Budală – accordionist
- Cornelia Catangă – accordionist and singer
- Florea Cioacă – violinist
- Angheluș Dinicu – pan flute player, grandfather of Grigoraş Dinicu and the author of the Skylark (Ciocârlia)
- Grigoraș Dinicu – Though he played other styles of music
- Damian Drăghici – pan flute player
- Ion Drăgoi – violinist
- Constantin Eftimiu – violinist and singer
- Toni Iordache – cimbalom player
- Fărâmiță Lambru – accordionist
- Damian Luca – pan flute player and Fănică Luca's nephew
- Fănică Luca – pan flute player and singer
- Gabi Luncă – singer
- Ionică Minune – accordionist
- Vasile Pandelescu – accordionist
- Nicolae Picu – violinist
- Romica Puceanu – singer
- Dona Dumitru Siminică – singer
- Petrea Crețu Șolcanu – violinist, grandfather of jazzman Johnny Răducanu
- Ion Petre Stoican – violinist
- Ionel Tudorache – accordionist and singer
- George Udilă – Son of Ilie Udilă
- Ilie Udilă – accordionist

== Film ==
- There is a full-feature movie called Lăutarii (1972, Moldova-film) by Moldavian Soviet director Emil Loteanu. The movie features the leader of the Moldovan State taraf "Flueraș" Sergiu Lunchevici (Sergei Lunkevich).
- Taraf de Haïdouks: their music and performances feature in the films Latcho Drom (France, 1993), The Man Who Cried (UK & France, 2000), and When the Road Bends… Tales of a Gypsy Caravan (UK, US, India, 2007).

== See also ==
- Music of Romania
- Romani music
- Klezmorim (Jewish lăutari-like musicians)
