= Tudor Gheorghe =

Romanian musician

Tudor Gheorghe KSR
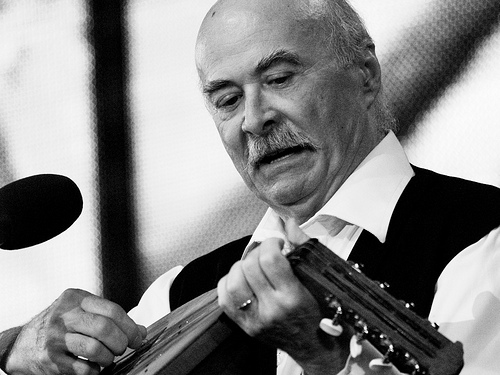
- Gheorghe in 2008
- Born: Gheorghe Tudor; August 1, 1945 (age 81); Podari, Dolj County, Kingdom of Romania
- Education: Carol I National College Caragiale National University of Theatre and Film
- Occupations: Singer-songwriter; actor; poet
- Years active: 1967–present
- Spouse: Georgeta Luchian (m. 1970; died 2021)
- Children: Adrian Tudor
- Awards: Order of the Star of Romania, Knight rank Order of the Republic (Moldova)
- Musical career
- Genres: Folk; Romanian peasant music; Romanian popular music; Lăutărească music; Spoken word; classical; Church music
- Instruments: Vocals; guitar; cobza
- Labels: Electrecord; Illuminati; Cat Music
- Website: www.tudor-gheorghe.ro

Tudor Gheorghe KSR (Romanian pronunciation: [ˈtudor ˈɡe̯orɡe]; born August 1, 1945) is a Romanian musician, actor, and poet known primarily for his politically charged musical career and his collaborations with well-known figures of late 20th-century Romanian poetry. His recording work is sometimes associated with anti communist activism and has received much critical acclaim over the years. The son of an Iron Guard member, he was banned from performing and recording in 1987 after a concert at Sala Palatului in Bucharest, following a number of run-ins with Romania's communist authorities throughout the 1970s and 1980s.

== Biography ==
Born in Podari, Dolj County, Tudor Gheorghe started his secondary studies at the Frații Buzești High School in Craiova. Expelled for political reasons in 9th grade, he moved to stay with some aunts in Arad, attending the city's Moise Nicoară High School. The following year he returned to Craiova, where he studied at the Carol I High School, from which he graduated in due course. He then studied to be an actor, graduating from the I.L. Caragiale Institute of Theatre and Film Arts in Bucharest in 1966. He later started composing music as a means of expressing his interest in Romanian poetry. His first national tour in 1969 was critically and commercially acclaimed and established him as a figure of the fledgling contemporary folk scene in Romania. His recording career, spanning fifty years, has frequently defied pop music conventions while exploring various traditions in Romanian music, from folk, religious music, the anti-communist anthems of Jean Moscopol to popular music of interwar Romania, at times embracing even children's or classical music. Throughout his early career, he performed with a guitar or lute with no backing musicians or vocalists but, starting in the early 2000s, he has incorporated orchestras, choirs, and tarafs into his performances. He resumed his musical career in 1992 but, dissatisfied with the way promoters wanted to market his music, took another six-year break from performing live. He has been touring constantly since 1998 and has recorded most of his concerts, releasing them as albums and generally avoiding studio work.

Throughout his career, he has been praised as a performer and songwriter by a number of Romanian literary figures. The poet and playwright Marin Sorescu addressed his personal relationship with Gheorghe in 1988 by saying that "Every time I listen to his music [...] Tudor Gheorghe reinforces my hunch that Romanian poetry [...] can move mountains", while Adrian Păunescu described him as "a great poet who neglects his talent". In an article published in the Flacăra magazine in 1973, Dorin Tudoran chronicled Gheorghe's precarious living conditions at the time, characterizing him as "a great artist, who has abundantly proved to be perfectly aware of his obligations".

The University of Craiova and the Constantin Brâncuși University of Târgu Jiu have awarded him doctor honoris causa titles for his contributions to Romanian music and culture and both Romania and the Republic of Moldova have decorated him with the Order of the Star of Romania and the Order of the Republic, respectively. In a 2006 poll conducted by Romanian Television to identify the "100 greatest Romanians of all time", he came in 76th.

== Discography ==
=== Studio albums ===
Year	Album	Label
1973	Viața Lumii	Electrecord
1975	Cîntece. De Dragoste, de Țară	Electrecord
1976	Veniți, Privighetoarea Cîntă	Electrecord
1978	Tudor Gheorghe	Electrecord
1989	Primăvara	Electrecord
2001	Primăvara Simfonic	Illuminati/Cat Music
2001	Toamna Simfonic	Illuminati/Cat Music
2002	Petrecerea cu Taraf	Illuminati/Cat Music
2002	Pe-un Franc Poet	Illuminati/Cat Music
2003	Iarna Simfonic	Roton
2004	Diligența cu Păpuși	Illuminati/Cat Music
2006	Trimite Vorbă - Petrecerea cu Taraf 2	Roton

Starting in the late 1990s, Tudor Gheorghe has performed almost exclusively in live concerts, recording and releasing them as albums.

=== Live albums ===
Year	Album	Label
1998	Reîntoarcerea	Intercont Music
1999	Mie-mi Pasă!	Intercont Music
2005	Răsuri și Trandafiri	Illuminati/Cat Music
2005	Cu Iisus în Celulă	Illuminati/Cat Music
2006	În Căutarea Dorului Pierdut	Illuminati/Cat Music
2006	Vara Simfonic	Illuminati/Cat Music
2007	Calvarul Unei Inime Pribegi	Illuminati/Cat Music
2007	Când Dumnezeu Era Mai Jos - Petrecerea cu Taraf 3	Illuminati/Cat Music
2007	Parfumele Nebunelor Dorinți	Illuminati/Cat Music
2013	Degeaba	Illuminati/Cat Music
2013	Mahalaua Mon Amour	Illuminati/Cat Music
2013	La Margine de Imperii	Illuminati/Cat Music
2013	Chemarea Păsarii de Acasă	Illuminati/Cat Music

== Sources ==
- Ștefănescu, Elena (1992). Tudor Gheorghe la curțile dorului. Editura Timișoara. ISBN 973-9353-86-X.
