= Dona Dumitru Siminică =

Romanian violinist and singer

- Born: September 13, 1926; Teiș, România
- Died: November 27, 1979 (aged 53) București, România
- Genres: Lăutărească music
- Occupation: Musician
- Instruments: vocals, violin
- Years active: 1944–1979
- Label: Electrecord

Dona Dumitru Siminică (13 September 1926 – 27 November 1979) was a Romanian violinist and singer of lăutărească music. He recorded prolifically for the Romanian state record label Electrecord from the late 1950s until the end of his life. (Note: See Dona Dumitru Siminică's discography in Romanian Wikipedia and on discogs.com.)

== Biography ==
Siminică was born in Teiș near Târgoviște, a small villages not far from Bucharest, Romania. He was the son of a Roma violinist named Nicolae Siminică, from whom he also learned to play the violin. His father also worked in construction, a trade which Dona Dumitru trained in as well. It was to work in construction that the family relocated to Bucharest.

In the mid-1940s, at age 18 Siminică became the leader of a lăutar music group in the Piața Amzei and then after five years he led another in the Piața Sfantul Gheorghe. He became known for his immense repertoire of vocal and instrumental music, including XIX century court music and other rare pieces inherited from his family. In 1956, he made his first appearances performing on the radio. In 1958, he then made his first recording for the state record label Electrecord in 1958, accompanied by the orchestra of Radu Voinescu. Thereafter, he recorded a long list of 78rpm and 33 rpm singles at Electrecord with the orchestras of Aurel Gore, Nicolae Băluță, Ion Mărgean, and others. During this time, he also collaborated with other singers such as Fărâmiţă Lambru, Maria Tănase or Gabi Luncă.

It was only in 1979 that he finally recorded a full-length LP album Inel, inel de aur with the orchestra of Nicolae Stan.

Robert Garfias mentions thin high pitched voices of several urban Roma singers in Romania, Dona Dumitru Siminică among them, as "something for which there is no known precedent in Romanian folk music and yet something not unusual in old Greek-Turkish popular music."

He died of a heart attack on 27 November 1979 in his apartment in Bucharest. He was 53 years old.

== Sources ==
- Garfias, Robert. "The Romanian Doina". academia.edu. Archived from the original on 2024-07-24.
- discogs.com. "Dona Dumitru Siminică". Discogs. Archived from the original on 2025-03-09.
- jurnalul.ro. "Siminica, la inregistrari cu satra dupa el". Archived from the original on 2025-02-05.
- folclor-romanesc.ro. "Dona Dumitru Siminică – Biografie Folclor Românesc". Folclor Românesc. Archived from the original on 2024-11-26.

== Video ==
- Siminică, Dona Dumitru (1965). "Inel, inel de aur". YouTube.
- Siminică, Dona Dumitru (1971a). "Afară e întuneric". YouTube.
- Siminică, Dona Dumitru (1971b). "Leliță Floare". YouTube.
