= Nicolae Picu =

Famous Romanian lăutar musician from Bukovina

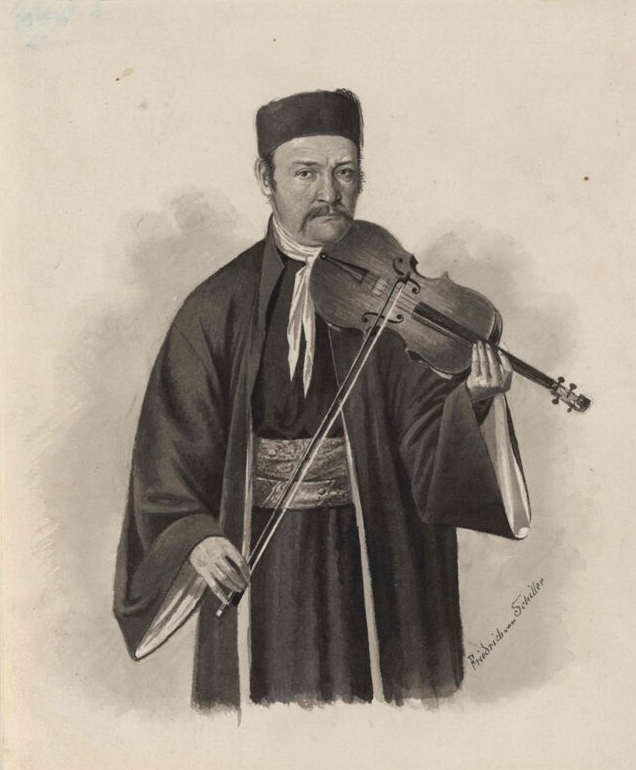
- Nicolae Picu in an 1899 gouache

Background information
- Born: 1789; Suceava, Bukovina District, Kingdom of Galicia and Lodomeria, Habsburg monarchy
- Died: 2 October 1864 (aged 74–75) Suceava, Duchy of Bukovina, Austrian Empire
- Genres: Lăutărească music
- Occupation: lăutar musician
- Instrument: folk violin

Nicolae Picu (Romanian pronunciation: [nikoˈla.e ˈpiku]; also known as Moș Neculai; (Note: From Romanian moș – old man.) 1789, Suceava – 2 October 1864, Suceava) was a Romanian lăutar violinist from the Duchy of Bukovina then part of the Austrian Empire.

He played a significant role in bringing traditional folk melodies to professional musicians of international stature, such as Franz Liszt and Karol Mikuli, thereby introducing Romanian lăutărească music to the academic musical world of his time.

== Biography ==
Picu was born in 1789 into a family of Romanian peasants of Greek Catholic faith from the vicinity of Suceava. In 1801, he began travelling through villages in search of engagements, primarily for weddings. By 1803, he was invited to perform at the courts of boyars, and gained particular recognition in the Hurmuzachi family.

From 1820 onward, he began performing each summer in Lăpușna, a spa resort near Berehomet that served as a popular gathering place for the Bukovinian aristocracy. The Bukovinian lawyer, musician, and politician Leon de Goian recalled a trip made with his parents in the summer of 1851 or 1852 to Lăpușna (as cited by Poslușnicu):

To the heartfelt delight of the visitors, as in every year, there played there the lăutari band under the leadership of the violinist and bandleader Neculai Picu, also known as Moș Neculai. In Lăpușna, this taraf was composed of twelve men, among whom were a nai player, one or two cobza players, a cellist, and the remainder violinists – perhaps also a viola.

…This taraf played rather harmoniously, and their program chiefly included Romanian songs, horas, doinas, and laments. (Note: cântece de jele) Moș Neculai, a man of medium height and sturdy build, fair-haired, dressed in the old Moldavian fashion – with zăbun, anteriu, (Note: Zăbun and anteriu – traditional Romanian garments worn by lăutari in the 19th century.) waist sash, and on his head a flattened fez with a blue tassel – was a true artist of the violin, from which he drew, with skill, a tone full, powerful, and brimming with feeling. Most soulfully did he play the mournful doina and the laments, bringing tears to the eyes of listeners.

He likewise played the dance tunes of all nations, and performed solo pieces with genuine virtuosity – among them a Turkish piece with a long tremolo…

I cherish a fond memory of Moș Neculai through a hora I learned from him – the Hora in G minor, which is found in the collection of Karol Mikuli under the title Douze (48) airs nationaux roumains, No. III…

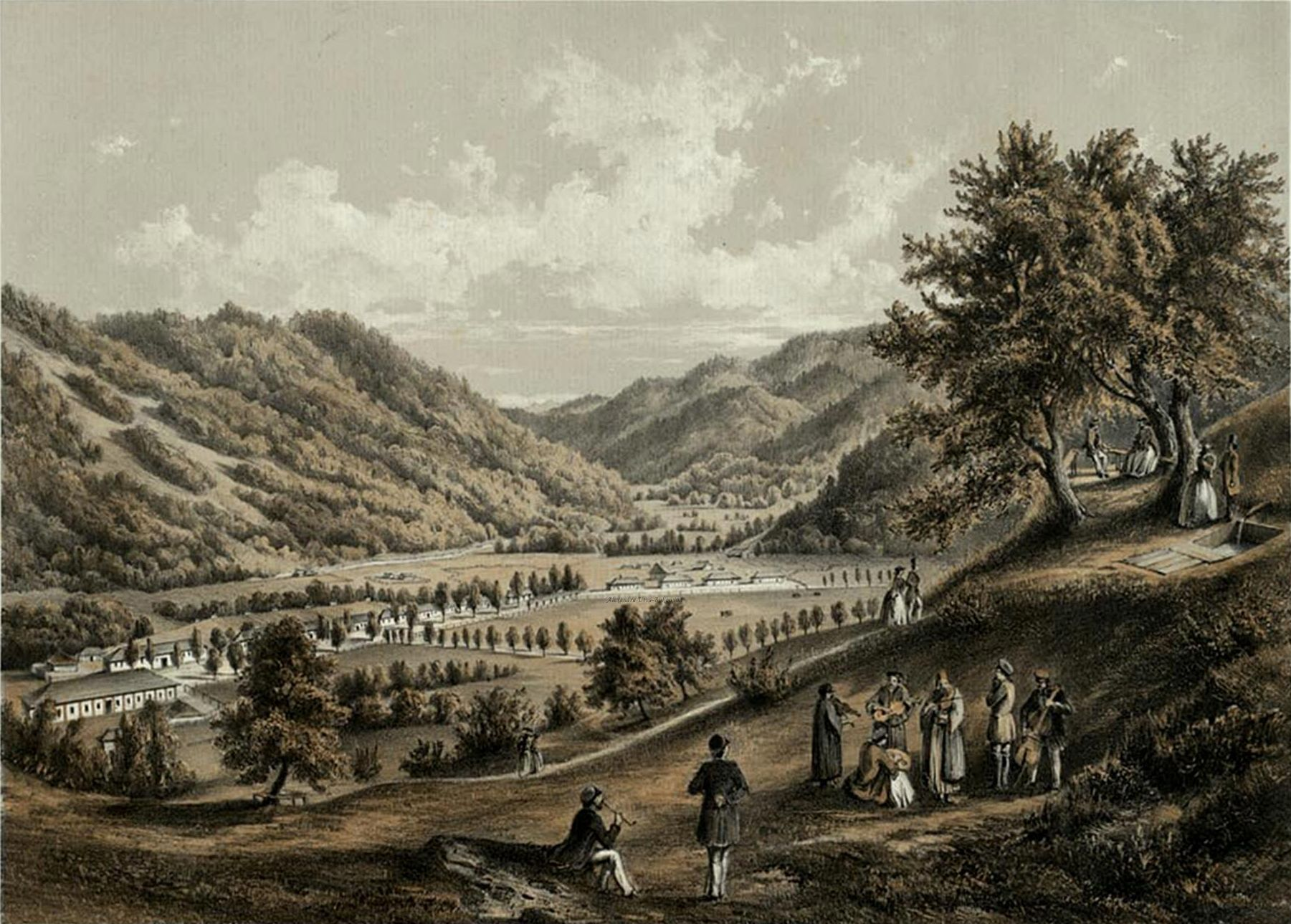
Franz Xaver Knapp – Bad Lopuszna. Nicolae Picu’s taraf with the Lăpușna landscape.

In May 1847, Franz Liszt visited Czernowitz at the invitation of Eudoxiu Hurmuzachi, where he gave two concerts at the Hôtel de Moldavie. At the Hurmuzachi family residence, Liszt listened to Nicolae Picu’s taraf perform. Following this encounter, Liszt began work on his Romanian Rhapsody for Piano (1848), which, in addition to themes he had earlier heard in Iași from Barbu Lăutaru, incorporated melodies from Picu’s repertoire, including Corăbeasca. (Note: Bidirel 1930s: A Moldavian dance Corăbească, as performed by the Bukovinian lăutar Alexandru Bidirel, who referred to himself as the grandson of Grigore Vindereu, a disciple of Nicolae Picu (Slabari & Cotos 2016, p. 130).)

In 1849, Bukovinian composer Karol Mikuli, a pupil of Frédéric Chopin, compiled a folklore collection consisting of four notebooks of piano transcriptions. It was later published in France as Douze airs nationaux roumains. The collection was based on Nicolae Picu’s repertoire: among the best-known pieces are Hora cea cu flori la pălărie, Hora în ghe mol, Arcanul, Buciumul, and others. The initiative once again came from the Hurmuzachi family. Eudoxiu’s son, Constantin Hurmuzachi, wrote in a letter dated 14 November 1851 to the Romanian writer and politician Gheorghe Bariț:

Until now, this rare talent [Karol Mikuli], under the direct guidance and encouragement of myself and my sister Săftica, has transcribed, based on the performances of the finest lăutari whom I have brought from various regions, more than thirty-six folk songs – among the most beautiful. They shall soon be sent to Lipsca.

In the early 1850s, Picu became the teacher of the violinist-lăutar Grigore Vindereu.

He died on 2 October 1864 in Suceava, at the age of 75.

== Legacy ==
In 1899, Nicolae Picu was named the most distinguished Bukovinian lăutar in the 24-volume illustrated encyclopedia of all lands of the Austrian Empire, The Austro-Hungarian Monarchy in Word and Picture, also known as the Kronprinzenwerk. (Note: Mosz Nikulai von Suczawa ist durch sein seelenvolles Spiel der Bedeutendste (Kronprinzen Rudolf & Weil von Weilen 1899, p. 369)) A gouache painting of Nicolae Picu, (Note: Lautar Mosz Nikulai aus Suczawa.) created for the Bukovina volume of the encyclopedia, is kept at the Austrian National Library.

Nicolae Picu’s repertoire has been revived by the taraf Zicălașii from Suceava.

== Bibliography ==
- Mikuli, Charles (c. 1855). Douze airs nationaux roumains. Ballades, chants de bergers, airs de danse etc. Recueillis et transcrits pour le piano [Twelve Romanian national tunes. Ballads, shepherds' songs, dance tunes etc. Collected and transcribed for the piano] (in French).
- Kronprinzen Rudolf; Weil von Weilen, Joseph, eds. (1899). Die österreichisch-ungarische Monarchie in Wort und Bild. Bukowina [The Austro-Hungarian Monarchy in Word and Picture. Bukovina] (in German). Vol. 20. Wien: Die kaiserlich-königliche Hof- und Staatsdruckerei.
- Bănescu, Nicolae (1911). Corespondenţa familiei Hurmuzachi cu Gheorghe Bariţ [Correspondence of the Hurmuzachi family with Gheorghe Bariţ] (in Romanian). Vălenii-de-Munte: Tipografia Neamul Românesc.
- Poslușnicu, Mihail Gr. (1928). Istoria musicei la români [The history of Romanian music] (in Romanian). București: Cartea Românească.
- Cosma, Viorel (1996). Lăutarii de ieri şi de azi [Lăutari of yesterday and today]. Colecţia Destine (in Romanian) (2nd ed.). Bucureşti: DU Style. ISBN 978-973-9246-05-7.
- Chiseliță, Vasile (2009). "Fenomenul lăutăriei și tradiția instrumental" [The phenomenon of lăutări playing and the instrumental tradition]. Arta muzicală a Moldovei. Istorie și modernitate (in Romanian). Chișinău: Grafema Libris: 73–99. ISBN 978-9975-52-046-1.
- Luceac, Ilie (2015). Eudoxiu (Doxaki) Hurmuzaki (1812-1874). Personalităţi bucovinene (in Romanian). Cernăuţi: Alexandru cel Bun, Eudoxiu Hurmuzachi. ISBN 978-617-7172-37-5.
- Slabari, Nicolae; Cotos, Mihai (2016). "O privire de ansamblu asupra repertoriului folcloric pentru vioară al lăutarului bucovinean A. Bidirel" [An overview of the folkloric violin repertoire of the Bucovinian lăutar A. Bidirel]. Studiul Artelor şi Culturologie: Istorie, teorie, practică. 2 (29): 128–134. ISSN 2345-1408.

=== External sources ===
- von Schiller, Friedrich (1899). "Lautar Mosz Nikulai aus Suczawa". onb.digital (in German). Österreichische Nationalbibliothek. Archived from the original on 2025-04-19.

=== Video ===
- Bidirel, Alexandru (1930s). "Joc: Corăbească". YouTube (in Romanian).
- Zicălașii (2020). "Ultimii lăutari ai Bucovinei — Nicolae Picu". YouTube.
