= Ornamental =

Ornamental may refer to:

- Ornamental grass, a type of grass grown as a decoration
- Ornamental iron, mild steel that has been formed into decorative shapes, similar to wrought iron work
- Ornamental plant, a plant that is grown for its ornamental qualities
- Ornament (architecture), a decorative detail used to embellish parts of a building or interior furnishing
- Ornament (art)
- Ornament (music), musical flourishes that are not necessary to the overall melodic (or harmonic) line

== Music ==
- Ornamental, a music group formed as a side project of Strawberry Switchblade vocalist Rose McDowall

== See also ==
- Ornament (disambiguation)
