= Picu =

Picu or PICU may refer to:

- Nicolae Picu (1789–1864), Romanian lăutar violinist
- Picu, a village in the Romanian commune of Ionești, Gorj
- Pediatric intensive care unit
- Psychiatric intensive-care unit
