= Speranța Rădulescu =

Romanian ethnomusicologist and anthropologist

- Born: February 13, 1949; Buzău, Romania
- Died: January 21, 2022 (aged 72); Bucharest, Romania
- Citizenship: Romania
- Education: National University of Music Bucharest
- Known for: Lăutărească music
- Awards: Ciprian Porumbescu Prize of the Romanian Academy (1984), Coup de Cœur Award of the Charles Cros Academy (2005), Schallplatten Kritik Award (2007), Coup de Cœur Award of the Charles Cros Academy (2020).
- Scientific career
- Fields: Ethnomusicology, Anthropology, Romanian musical folklore, Lăutărească music
- Website: sperantaradulescu.ro

Speranța Rădulescu (Romanian pronunciation: [speˈrant͡sa rəduˈlesku]; 13 February 1949 – 21 January 2022) was a Romanian musicologist and anthropologist, specializing in musical folklore.

== Biography ==
Rădulescu began her musical education in Târgoviște, later moving to Bucharest where she studied musical composition at the Conservatory (now the National University of Music Bucharest) under Tudor Ciortea and Myriam Marbé.

From 1973 to 1990, she worked as a musicologist at the Institute of Ethnography and Folklore, the successor to the Folklore Archive established in 1928 by the Society of Romanian Composers, under the initiative of Constantin Brăiloiu.

In 1984, she earned her doctorate in musicology from the Conservatory in Cluj-Napoca (now the Gheorghe Dima National Music Academy). After 1990, she continued her research at the National Museum of the Romanian Peasant, conducting fieldwork in various regions of the country.

In 1994, she co-founded the Alexandru Țigara-Samurcaș Foundation, supporting ethnological research, and later served as its director.

From 2005, Rădulescu was an associate professor at the National University of Music Bucharest.

She was a member of the Union of Romanian Composers and Musicologists, the French Society for Ethnomusicology, and the International Council for Traditional Music.

== Work ==
The Institute of Ethnography and Folklore in Romania underwent several changes during the socialist period. Between 1974 and 1990, it operated as the Institute of Ethnological and Dialectological Research, (Note: Institutul de Cercetări Etnologice și Dialectologice.) in line with official ideology that promoted a unitary and indivisible view of Romanian peasant music. This nationalist framework limited deeper differentiation, and the concept of “musical purity” was permitted only within micro-dialectal boundaries. Research of this period followed a standard structure, focusing on musical practice descriptions, genre cataloguing, and detailed transcription.

Rădulescu pursued an independent research approach, with a special focus on Romani musical traditions, which she viewed as a key source of dynamism in oral musical forms. Her work emphasized the study of variation and transformation within traditional music, and its evolution within natural contexts. She promoted a positive and meaningful interpretation of musical dissemination.

She carried out extensive research on lăutărească music, concentrating on the traditions performed by professional Romani musicians. Her studies examined the structure, style, and improvisational techniques of this genre, as well as the transmission of musical knowledge within Romani communities. Rădulescu, sometimes called the "mother of the lăutari," documented rare and forgotten Romanian folk melodies and highlighted the essential role of lăutari in preserving the country's musical heritage.

She played a key role in the international recognition of Romanian lăutari, particularly the taraf from Clejani (later known as Taraf de Haïdouks) and the Moldovan brass band Fanfara Zece Prăjini.

Rădulescu contributed to the study of improvisation, ornamentation, and modal systems in Romanian folk music and analyzed the interaction between oral and written musical traditions.

Together with Margaret Beissinger and Anca Giurchescu, she explored the aesthetics of manele.

She was a vocal critic of the “official folklore” promoted in socialist Romania, describing it as “manufactured in the image of our society: planned from the 'centre', ideologically conformist, hopelessly optimistic, noisy, artificial, false.”

Between 1988 and 2019, she organized numerous international tours featuring traditional Romanian music in Switzerland, France, the United Kingdom, Italy, Belgium, the Netherlands, Germany, Austria, Greece, Spain, and Luxembourg. Notable performances took place at Teatro La Fenice (Venice, 1997 and 1998), Théâtre de la Ville and La Villette (Paris, 1988–2019 ), Maison des Cultures du Monde (Paris), and the University of Music and Performing Arts in Vienna.

She contributed the sections “Traditional music. General” and “Traditional music. Gypsy music” to the article "Romania" in The New Grove Dictionary of Music and Musicians. She also authored four entries in the Bloomsbury Encyclopedia of Popular Music of the World: “Doina,” “Manea/Manele,” “Muzica Lautareasca,” and “Muzica Populara (Romania).”

== Fieldwork and recordings ==
Rădulescu conducted extensive field research documenting performances by traditional musicians from across Romania. Many of her recordings were released by the Electrecord label.

She collaborated with the Smithsonian Institution on the album Romania: Music from the Maramureș Region, released by Smithsonian Folkways. The album is part of UNESCO’s collection of traditional music.

She produced and edited several important collections of traditional Romanian music, including:

- Preparation and publication of edited recordings by Constantin Brăiloiu (with Laurent Aubert);
- 1982–1984: Six LPs in the Document series (Taraful Tradițional Românesc, with Carmen Betea), with liner notes in English, French, and Romanian;
- Ethnophonie series – 30 CDs of lăutărească music (with Costin Moisil and Florin Iordan);
  - The first 10 volumes received the Coup de Cœur award from the Charles Cros Academy (2005);
  - The 12th volume received the Schallplatten Kritik award (2007);
- CD "Taraful Bucureştilor. The Music of the Gypsy Lăutari of Bucharest" released by Maison des Cultures du Monde (Coup de Cœur Award of the Charles Cros Academy, 2020).
- Two CDs on the Music of the World label: "The Edge of the Forest" and "Taraf"
- 17 albums of Romanian folk music released in France, Switzerland, the United States, and Germany.

== Selected publications ==
- Rădulescu, Speranța (1984). Taraful şi acompaniamentul armonic în muzica de joc [The Taraf and Harmonic Accompaniment in Dance Music]. Colecția națională de folclor (in Romanian). București: Editura Muzicală.
- Rădulescu, Speranța (1996). "Gypsy Music versus the Music of Others". Martor (The Museum of the Romanian Peasant Anthropology Journal). Vol. 1. București. pp. 134–145.
- Rădulescu, Speranța (1997). "Traditional Musics and Ethnomusicology: Under Political Pressure: The Romanian Case". Anthropology Today. 13 (6): 8–12. doi:10.2307/2783376. JSTOR 2783376.
- Bouët, Jacques; Lortat-Jacob, Bernard; Rădulescu, Speranța (2002). À tue-tête: Chant et violon au Pays de l'Oach, Roumanie [Loud and Unrestrained: Singing and Violin in Oaș Country, Romania] (in French). Nanterre: Société d’Ethnologie. ISBN 978-2901161660.
- Bouët, Jacques; Lortat-Jacob, Bernard; Rădulescu, Speranţa (2006). Din răsputeri. Glasuri şi cetere din Ţara Oaşului [Loud and Unrestrained: Singing and Violin in Oaș Country, Romania] (in Romanian). București: Institutul Cultural Român. ISBN 978-973-577-499-8.
- Rădulescu, Speranța (2009). Aubert, Laurent (ed.). "Un repère durable: Constantin Brailoiu (1893–1958)". Mémoire vive. Hommages à Constantin Brăiloiu. Gollion/Genève: Infolio/Musée d'ethnographie de Genève. ISBN 978-2-88474-232-0.
- Giurchescu, Anca; Rădulescu, Speranţa (2011). "Music, Dance, and Behaviour in a New Form of Expressive Culture: The Romanian Manea". Yearbook for Traditional Music. 43: 1–36. doi:10.5921/yeartradmusi.43.0001.
- Rădulescu, Speranţa (2015). Taifasuri despre muzica ţigănească [Conversations about Gypsy Music] (in Romanian). Paideia. ISBN 978-606-748-073-3.
- Beissinger, Margaret H.; Rădulescu, Speranța; Giurchescu, Anca, eds. (2016). Manele in Romania: Cultural Expression and Social Meaning in Balkan Popular Music. Europea: Ethnomusicologies and Modernities. Lanham: Rowman & Littlefield. ISBN 978-1-4422-6708-4.
- Rădulescu, Speranța (2021). Regards sur la musique en Roumanie au XXe siècle. Musiciens, musiques, institutions [Reflections on Music in 20th-Century Romania: Musicians, Genres, and Institutions] (in French). Paris: Editions L'Harmattan. ISBN 978-2-343-23193-8.
- Rădulescu, Speranța (2022). Peisaje muzicale în România secolului XX [Musical Landscapes in 20th-Century Romania] (in Romanian) (2nd ed.). București: Editura Universității Naționale de Muzică București. ISBN 978-606-659-137-9.

== Bibliography ==
- Sadie, Stanley; Tyrrell, John, eds. (2001). The New Grove Dictionary of Music and Musicians (2nd ed.). New York: Macmillan Publishers Limited. ISBN 0-333-60800-3.
- Prato, Paolo; Horn, David, eds. (2017). Bloomsbury Encyclopedia of Popular Music of the World. Genres: Europe. Vol. 11. London: Bloomsbury Publishing. ISBN 9781501326103.
- Beissinger, Margaret H. (2022). "Speranţa Rădulescu and Lăutari: Engaging with Musicians and Music-Making" (PDF). Musicology Today: Journal of the National University of Music Bucharest. 13 (2 (50)): 147–167.
- Lortat-Jacob, Bernard; Aubert, Laurent (2022). "Deux hommages à Speranța Rădulescu (1949–2022)" [Two Tributes to Speranța Rădulescu (1949–2022)]. Cahiers d'ethnomusicologie (in French) (35). Ateliers d'ethnomusicologie: 277–286.
- Beissinger, Margaret H. (2023). "Ultimele cântece bătrânești din Olt / Last Old Songs From Olt. Review". Music & Minorities. 2: 1–7. doi:10.52413/mm.2023.17. eISSN 2791-4569.

== External sources ==
- sperantaradulescu.ro. "Speranța Rădulescu". Muzeul Național al Țăranului Român. Archived from the original on 2025-02-27.
- Taraful Tradițional Românesc. "The Traditional Folk Music Band". Discogs. Archived from the original on 2025-02-14.
- Brăiloiu, Constantin; Rădulescu, Speranţa; Aubert, Laurent (1988). "ROUMANIE. Musique de villages. 1. Olténie: Runc et les villages du Gorj. 2. Moldavie: Fundu Moldovei et la Bucovine. 3. Transylvanie: Drăguş et le Pays de l'Olt (3 CD AIMP IX-XI/VDE 487–489)". vdegallo.com (in French). VDE-GALLO.
- Ethnophonie Record Label. "Ethnophonie". Discogs. Archived from the original on 2022-02-13.
- Ethnophonie Channel. "Ethnophonie". YouTube.
- Mama lăutarilor. "A plecat doamna Speranța, mama lăutarilor" [Mrs. Speranța has gone, the mother of the lăutari]. scena9.ro (in Romanian). Archived from the original on 2024-07-21.
- Fundaţia Samurcaş. "Fundaţia Alexandru Tzigara Samurcaş" [Alexandru Tzigara Samurcaş Foundation]. muzeultaranuluiroman.ro (in Romanian). Archived from the original on 2024-09-07.
- Smithsonian Folkways. "Romania: Festive Music from the Maramures Region". Smithsonian Folkways. Archived from the original on 2024-12-19.
