= Grigoraș Dinicu =

Romanian violinist of Romani ethnicity

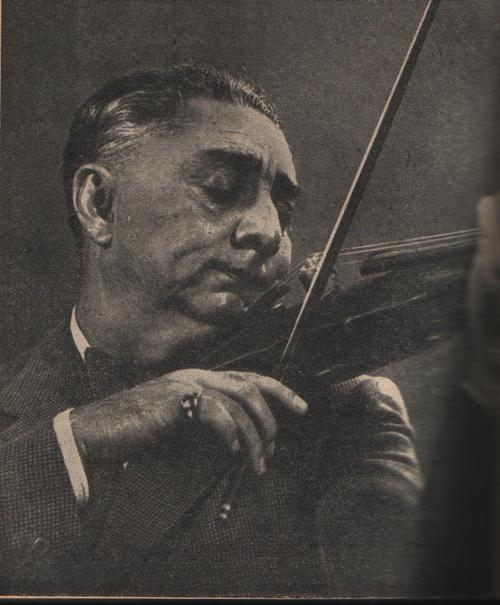

Background information
- Born: April 3, 1889
- Died: March 28, 1949 (aged 59)
- Genres: Lăutărească music
- Instrument: Violin

Grigoraș Ionică Dinicu (Romanian: [ɡriɡoˈraʃ joˈnikə diˈniku]; April 3, 1889 – March 28, 1949) was a Romanian violin virtuoso and composer of Roma ethnicity. He is most famous for his often-played virtuoso violin showpiece "Hora staccato" (1906) and for making popular the tune Ciocârlia, composed by his grandfather Angheluș Dinicu for nai. It is rumored that Jascha Heifetz once said that Grigoraș Dinicu was the greatest violinist he had ever heard. In the 1930s he was involved in the political movement of the Romanian Roma and was made honorary president of the "General Union of the Romanian Roma". Other well known compositions are: Hora mărțișorului (Mărțișor, literally "little March", is a major Romanian seasonal holiday on March 1), Ceasornicul (The Clock) and Căruța poștei (The Post Wagon).

== Early life and education ==
He was born in Bucharest, in the neighborhood of the lăutari named Scaune (Chairs). Because his father was busy with his activity as a lăutar, he handed him over to "moș Zamfir", an old violinist, who taught him the first tunes. He attended the Bucharest Conservatory, where he studied with Dumitru Georgescu-Kiriac. The most famous of his teachers was Carl Flesch, the violin pedagogue, with whom he studied in 1902. He received a scholarship at the Vienna Conservatory, but he was not allowed to go there because he was Romani, an episode that he never forgot.

== Career ==
External audio
- You may hear Grigoras Ionică Dinicu's Hora staccato as performed by Jascha Heifetz accompanied by the pianist Emanuel Bay in 1938 Here on archive.org

After graduation he played violin with the Orchestra of the Ministry of Public Instruction, and also performed as a soloist. Hora staccato dates from the beginning of this period; he wrote it as a graduation exercise. For forty years, from 1906 until 1946, he directed popular music concerts. He also toured abroad as a soloist and conductor, and he also played a great deal of light music in nightclubs, hotels, restaurants, and cafés in Bucharest and throughout Western Europe.

His music is mostly for violin and piano, though some pieces (such as Hora staccato) have later been arranged for other combinations of instruments (for example, trumpet and piano, as well as violin and orchestra and a popular arrangement by Russian mandolin virtuoso Dave Apollon).

He died in Bucharest on March 28, 1949, of laryngeal cancer.

== Miscellanea ==
The jazz manouche violinist Stéphane Grappelli was an admirer of Dinicu and the way that the violin was played in the lăutărească music. A compilation of his music was issued by the Romanian state record company Electrecord EPE 01491 (LP) in the early 1960s, where he can be heard playing his original version of Hora Staccato.
