= Hora staccato =

1906 virtuoso violin showpiece by Grigoraș Dinicu

Hora staccato (1906) is a virtuoso violin showpiece by Grigoraș Dinicu. It is a short, fast work in a Romanian hora style, and has become a favorite encore of violinists, especially in the 1932 arrangement by Jascha Heifetz. The piece requires an exceptional command of both upbow and downbow staccato. The character of the piece also demands the notes be articulated in a crisp and clear manner so that the vibrancy of music comes out.

== History ==
Dinicu wrote it for his graduation in 1906 from the Bucharest Conservatory, and performed at the ceremony. Subsequently, it has been arranged for other combinations of instruments, notably trumpet and piano. The piece was arranged for full symphonic orchestra ("pour grand orchestre instrumenté"). The manuscript is signed by the Bulgarian arranger, Pantcho Vladigueroff, April 5, 1942 and resides in the library of the Bucharest Philharmonic with a catalogue (or work) number 1361.

External audio
- You can hear Jascha Heifetz performing Hora staccato accompanied by the pianist Emanuel Bay in 1938 Here on archive.org

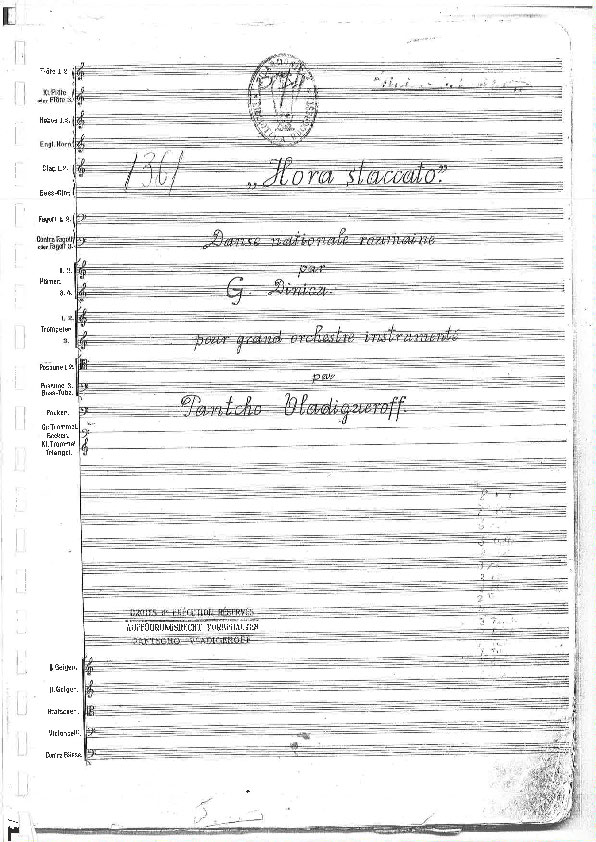
The transcriber's cover page.

== References and further reading ==
- The Concise Edition of Baker's Biographical Dictionary of Musicians, 8th ed. Revised by Nicolas Slonimsky. New York, Schirmer Books, 1993. ISBN 0-02-872416-X

Specific
