= Gabi Luncă =

Romanian-Romani singer (1938–2021)

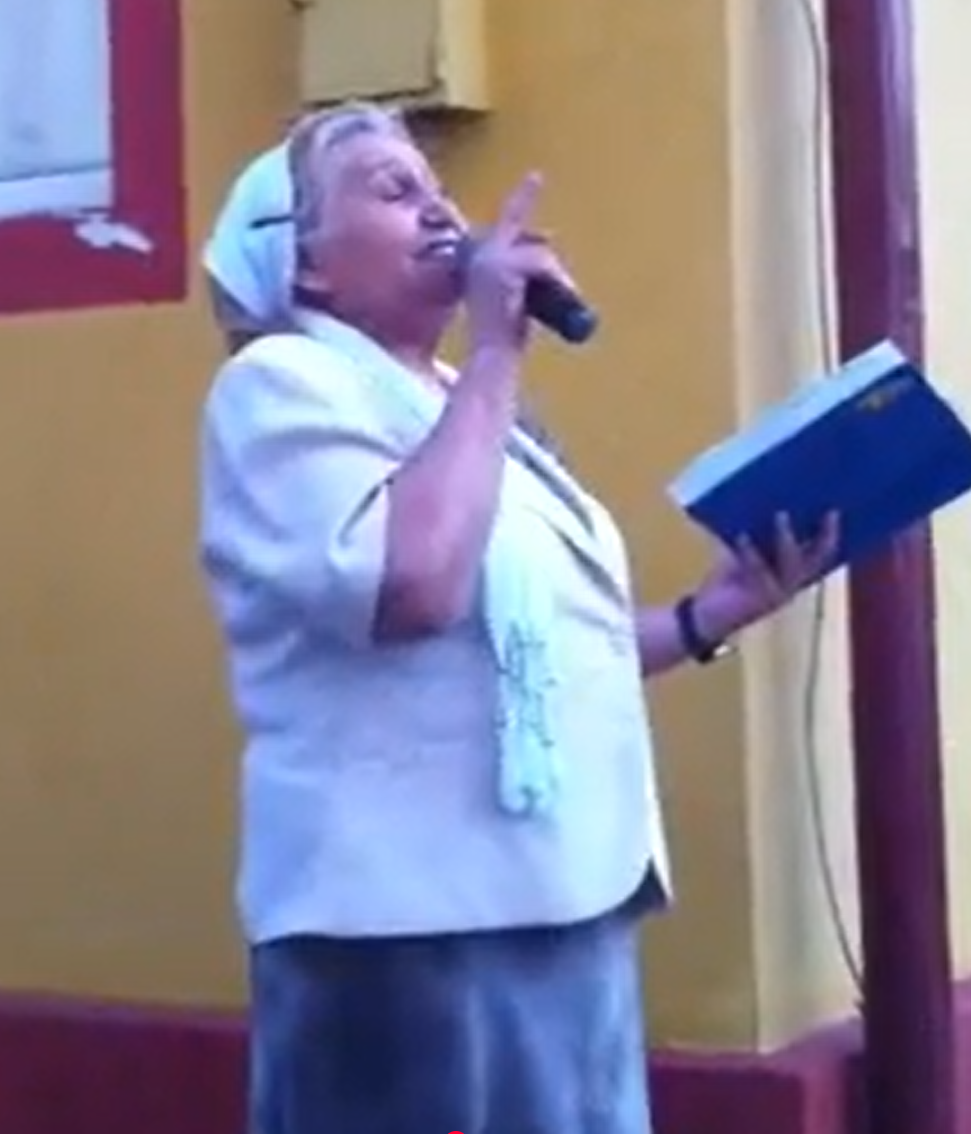

Background information
- Born: Elena Gabriela Luncă; 16 October 1938; Vărbilău, Prahova County, Kingdom of Romania
- Died: 2 April 2021 (aged 82) Bucharest, Romania
- Genres: Lăutărească music, Romani folk, Christian music
- Occupation: Singer
- Instrument: vocals
- Years active: 1951–1993
- Labels: Electrecord

Gabi Luncă (16 October 1938 – 2 April 2021), often regarded as "Queen of lăutărească music", was a Romanian-Romani lăutar musician. Born in Vărbilău, Prahova County, Romania, she was also a folk singer.

== Life ==
Her father was also part of the lăutari, a very respected violinist because he was a "notist" (he knew how to read music). Her mother died when she was very young and this left a major impression on her life; many of her songs deal with the "mother" theme.

She was a favorite of Romania's communist ruler Nicolae Ceaușescu and his wife Elena.

In the later part of her life, Gabi Luncă converted to Pentecostalism and started singing exclusively religious music.

She was married to the great accordionist Ion Stan-Onoriu.

Gabi Luncă died of COVID-19 in Bucharest, at the age of 82.
