= Taraf (musical band) =

Type of folk music band in Romania and Moldova

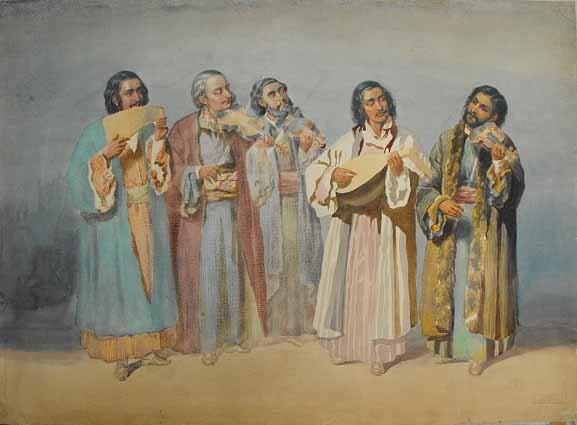
Taraf of Ochi-Albi, an 1860 painting by Carol Szathmari

A taraf is a small lăutărească music ensemble from Romania or Moldova, usually consisting of three to eight musicians-lăutari. Instruments include the violin, cello, tambourine, accordion, harmonica and cimpoi (Romanian bagpipes). Tarafs also often include an instrument typical to the region: a cobza and cimbalom (Wallachia and Oltenia) a trumpet and flute (Moldova), a Tárogató (near Banat), a clarinet (Transylvania), or a two or three stringed guitar (in Maramureş county) sometimes called a "zongora". Players may also use instruments improvised from grass, birch bark, mussel shells, and leaves.

== Famous tarafs ==
The group Taraf de Haïdouks, introduced to the West in the 1990s, brought the word to international fame.
