= Romica Puceanu =

Romanian singer (1927–1996)

Romica Puceanu (Vlax Romani: Romika Puchanu; 1926–1996) was a Romani singer and interpreter of urban lăutărească music from Romania.

== Early life ==
Puceanu started to sing professionally when she was 14, with the "Brothers Gore taraf", one of the most famous tarafuri of the time.

== Career ==
She was highly appreciated for her unique voice and for the sensibility of her singing.

== Personal life ==
Despite her professional success, she had an unhappy love life, which led to some drinking problems, and also affected her voice in the latter part of her life.

She was married to the accordionist Bebe Șerban (also known as "Bebe de la Petrichioaia" – "Bebe from Petrichioaia"). Cornelia Teișanu, her niece, is also a singer.

== Death ==
Puceanu died as a result of a car accident in 1996.

== See also ==
- Music of Romania
