= Robert Garfias =

Robert Garfias (b. 1932 in San Francisco) is an American ethnomusicologist and musicologist. He is a professor of Anthropology and a member of The Social Dynamics and Complexity Group at the University of California, Irvine as well as a professor at the Japanese National Museum of Ethnology in Senri, Osaka.

During the 1950s Garfias performed for several years in the Sausalito ensemble of Harry Partch, appearing on two LPs (Plectra & Percussion Dances, 1953; and Oedipus, 1954). In 1955 he produced an 11-part radio series about the music of Japan for the KPFA radio station, and from 1962 to 1968 he served as the first music director for KRAB, a noncommercial listener-supported station in Seattle, WA, producing several hundred programs for a series called "Ethnic Music with Robert Garfias" between 1963 and 1982 He completed his doctorate at University of California, Los Angeles and taught at the University of Washington where he established the graduate program in ethnomusicology before coming to University of California, Irvine. He has conducted research on the analysis of complex music systems, including Japanese court music, the Turkish Ottoman Classical Music system, and many other musical traditions in which he is fluent as a musical performer, linguist, and archivist. He has also written on The Role of Dreams and Spirit Possession in the Mbira Dza Vadzimu Music of the Shona People of Zimbabwe. Complexity in the domain of expressive culture, music, and the social organization of complex musical traditions is one of his major specialties.

He has been actively engaged in the area of public policy and the arts as a presidentially appointed member of the National Council on the Arts and as a member of the Council of the Smithsonian Institution as well as with numerous state and local arts agencies. In these areas his primary concern is with ethnicity and cultural diversity.

In 2005 the Government of Japan awarded him the Order of the Rising Sun, Gold Rays with Neck Ribbon, which represents the third highest of eight classes associated with this award. He was cited for his contributions to promoting traditional Japanese culture and cultural exchanges between Japan and the United States.

== See also ==
- Guzheng—Chinese zither
- Kagura
- Kulintang
- List of University of California, Irvine people
- Marimba
- Sanjo (music)
- Shona music
- Traditional Korean musical instruments
  - Ajaeng
  - Gayageum
  - Jongmyo
  - Pyeongyeong
- Veena
