= Ornament =

An ornament is something used for decoration.

Ornament may also refer to:

== Decoration ==
- Ornament (art), any purely decorative element in architecture and the decorative arts
- Ornamental turning
- Biological ornament, a characteristic of animals that appear to serve only a decorative purpose
- Bronze and brass ornamental work, decorative work that dates back to antiquity
- Christmas ornament, a decoration used to festoon a Christmas tree
- Dingbat, decorations in typography
- Garden ornament, a decoration in a garden, landscape, or park
- Hood ornament, a decoration on the hood of an automobile
- Lawn ornament, a decoration in a grassy area
- Ornamental plant, a decorative plant
- Peak ornament, a decoration under the peak of the eaves of a gabled building

== Music ==
- Ornament (music), a flourish that serves to decorate music
- Ornament, a Russian band, forerunner to the band Kukuruza

== Other uses ==
- Ornament (football), the football team from Hong Kong
- Ornaments Rubric, a prayer of the Church of England

== See also ==
Ornamentation of the human body:

- Body modification
- Fashion
- Human physical appearance
- Jewelry
- Tattoo
