= Zongora =

The zongora is an instrument typical of Maramureș, a region of Romania. It is similar to a guitar, but has fewer strings. In the past it had two or three strings, but nowadays it has four or even five. It also has a special kind of tuning, as it is tuned by ear. When played, the instrument is usually held vertically. The string layout is compressed to the central inch of the fingerboard to allow rapid rhythmical strumming. Recent musicians make more harmonic changes than in the past, but still use only major chords.

The word zongora is also Hungarian for piano.
