= Cobza =

Stringed instrument

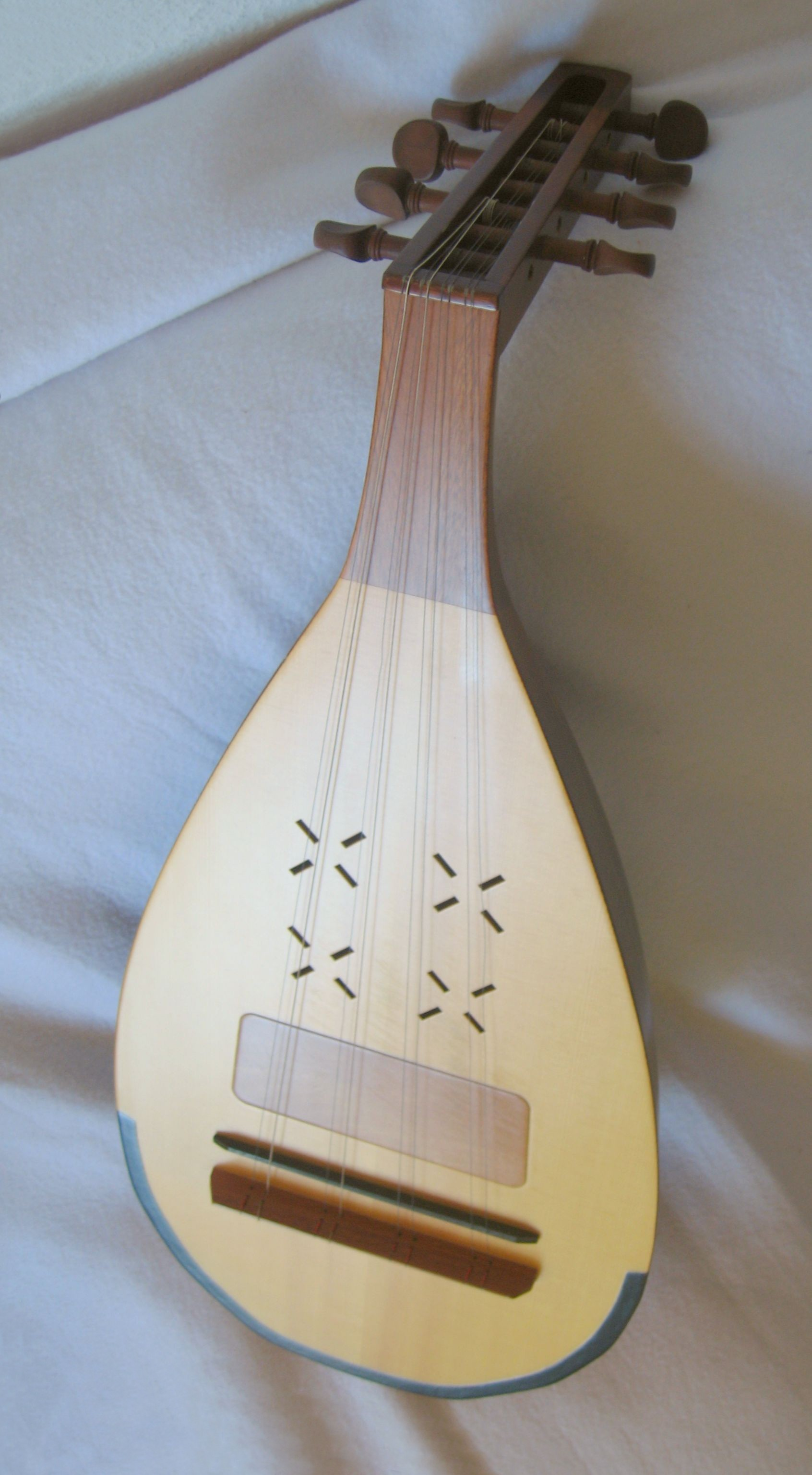

String instrument
- Other names: Koboz
- Classification: Necked bowl lutes; String instruments
- Hornbostel–Sachs classification: 321.321-6 (Composite chordophone sounded with a plectrum)

Related instruments
- List: Barbat (lute); Baglamadaki; Bağlama; Biwa; Bouzouki; Dombra; Domra; Dutar; Lavta; Lute; Mandocello; Mandola; Mandolin; Oud; Pipa; Qanbus

Cobza, traditional knowledge, skills and music
- UNESCO Intangible Cultural Heritage
- Country: Romania and Moldova
- Reference: 02262
- Region: Europe and North America

Inscription history
- Inscription: 2025 (20th session)
- List: Representative

The cobza (also cobsa, cobuz, koboz) is a multi-stringed instrument of the lute family of folk origin popular in Romanian, Moldovan and Hungarian folk music. It is a pear-shaped string instrument with a short neck and wooden body, traditionally used to provide rhythm and harmony in folk music. It can be played solo or in groups and is usually strummed with a folded goose feather.

It is considered the oldest accompaniment instrument in the region comprising Romania and Moldova. It is distinct from the Ukrainian kobza, an instrument of different construction and origin.

Usage of the koboz in Hungary dates back to at least the 17th century. Its usage by Székely Hungarians in Transylvania is recorded in the 16th century. A related instrument possibly arrived with the Hungarian tribes as early as the 9th and 10th centuries. The usage of the modern Romanian cobza in Hungary began following the Táncház movement of the late 20th century.

== Overview ==
Old peasant cobza from Northern Romania.

The Romanian cobza is metal-strung (although modern nylon-strung models exist, particularly in Hungary), and has a very short neck without frets (although a newer fretted cobza can be found in Moldova), with a bent-back pegbox. The back is ribbed. It is usually double or triple strung, and often has a characteristic flat end clasp.

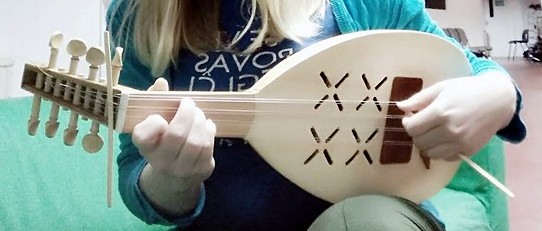
Modern cobza being played as an Oud, with a long thin plectrum.

The cobza is played with a plectrum (traditionally, a goose feather) in elaborate and florid melodic passagework, and has a pick-guard similar to that of an oud. Its strings are widely spaced at the bridge to facilitate this technique. It has a soft tone, most often tuned to D-A-D-G (although tuning depends on style, region and player).

The origins of the Romanian cobza are thought to be a local adaptation of the Persian barbat or Turkish oud, probably brought to the area by itinerant Romani musicians in the 15th century (a Rom/Romani musician is called lăutar, literally lute-player). A Cobza player specifically is called a "cobzar". Notable Cobza players were Ion Păturică, Ion Zlotea, Marin Cotoanță, Grigore Kiazim (from Wallachia), Nicolae Păsnicuțu and Constantin Negel (from Moldavia).

It seems that cobza was also used in various music ensembles in the Bukovina region in the mid-war periods, being replaced totally by the mandolin and 4 stringed domra when the north of this area became incorporated into the Ukrainian SSR.

The name of the instrument may come from the Turkic "kopuz".
