= Fluier =

Romanian flute

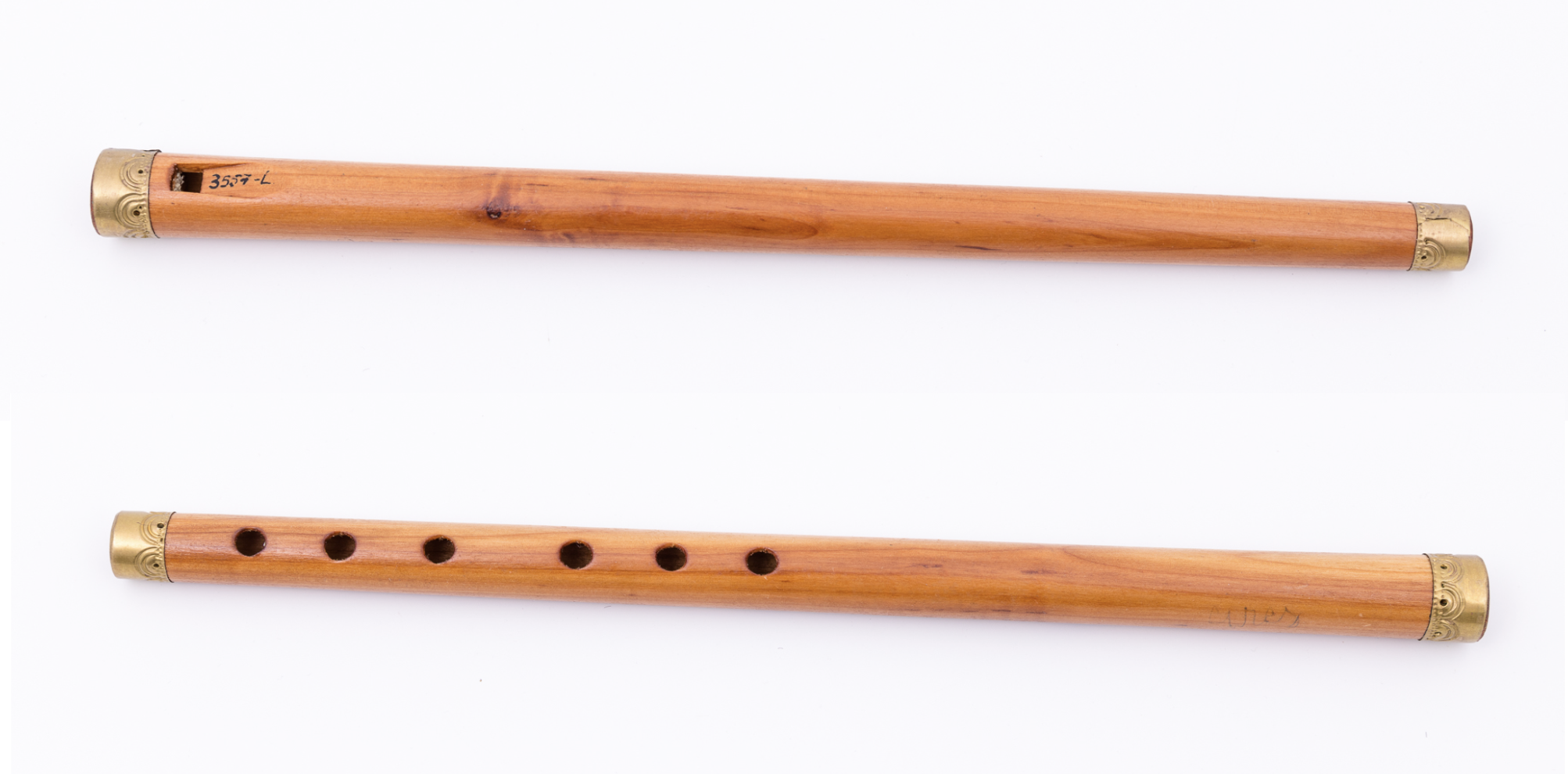
- Fluier with fipple, Muntenia, end of XX century
- Classification: Aerophone
- Hornbostel–Sachs classification: • 421.11 (fipple-less fluiers) • 421.22 (end-blown fipple fluiers) • 421.12 (transverse fluiers)

Related instruments
- floyara, frilka, frula, fujara, fujarka, furulya

The fluier (Romanian: fluier; [ˈflu.jer]) is a traditional Romanian wind instrument, a type of shepherd's flute, common throughout the entire Romanian cultural area. It is an instrument with ancient Romanian roots, used predominantly in solo performance. In traditional culture, the fluier is primarily associated with the image of the solitary shepherd, for whom it serves as a means of self-expression and an accompaniment to daily life. The instrument's name is presumed to originate from the Latin: flare – "to blow".

The fluier family includes instruments of various designs: single and double, end-blown, transverse and semi-transverse, open or equipped with a fipple, with a varying number of finger-holes or none at all. By length, they are distinguished as small, medium, and large. They are most often made of wood, with bone or metal fluiers being less common.

The playing technique is characterized by high virtuosity and a wealth of expressive devices. In traditional practice, an archaic method of sound production with a guttural background (Romanian: ison gâjâit, ison gutural, gemut) is widely used. In this technique, a steady low resonance sounds along with the main melody, giving the performance a characteristic acoustic depth.

The fluier played an important role in shepherd culture, performing not only musical but also ritual, signaling, and communicative functions. Its sound accompanied rites for protecting the flock, initiation, courtship, and funerals, and also served as an accompaniment for dances and festive songs. The repertoire covered a wide range of genres from magico-ritual melodies to entertainment pieces, reflecting the key aspects of rural community life.

== History ==
=== Origin and early evidence ===
The fluier is a wind instrument specific to the Romanian cultural area, which encompasses the historical and modern territories inhabited by Romanians. A combination of archaeological, historical, linguistic, and organological data testifies to its deep roots in the region. The oldest archaeological finds confirm the existence of flutes in this territory since prehistoric times: a bone flute from the Upper Paleolithic era was discovered at the Molodova V Paleolithic site (Chernivtsi Oblast, Ukraine). Later, ancient authors such as Xenophon and Strabo mentioned the use of flutes by the Thracian tribes who inhabited these lands. The Romanian linguistic heritage itself serves as important indirect evidence of the instrument's long history. The rich and diverse terminology used for the instrument – which includes numerous words derived from the root fluier alongside a multitude of other regional names, (Note: Romanian: caval, drigană, durloi, fiștigoaie, flisc, flișcă, flișcoaie (fliscoaie), fluieriță, fluieroi, fofează, piscoaie, pițigoaie, șuieră, șuierici, surlă, târtă, țâț, țignal, tilincă (telișcă, titilic, titilig, titilincă, titilișcă), țipătoare (țipă), totâlcă, trișcă, tulnec, tutelcă. (Sala 2002, p. 439)) as well as the great variety of fluier designs, each historically established in specific regions, point to a long and continuous process of the instrument's evolution within the Carpatho-Danubian space.

=== Spread in the Middle Ages ===
The migration of the Vlachs (ancestors of the Romanians) in the 13th–14th centuries, associated with the development of mountain pastoralism, had a significant influence on the culture of the Carpathian region. Medieval chronicles attest to the widespread establishment of shepherd settlements organized under "Vlach law" (Latin: jus valachicum) among the Slavic peoples of Central Europe – in Galicia, Slovakia, the Polish Podhale, and Moravian Wallachia. The name of the flute, fluier, spread alongside these pastoral practices and their associated terminology. Over time, it was adapted by neighboring peoples, which is reflected in the names of related shepherd's wind instruments: the Hungarian furulya, the Slovak fujara, the Polish fujarka, as well as the Ukrainian frilka and floyara.

=== The fluier at the hospodars' courts (16th–18th centuries) ===
Beginning in the 16th century, written sources confirm that the fluier was used not only in folk settings but also in the musical life at the courts of the hospodars (Note: Hospodar was the historical title for the ruling prince or voivode in the principalities of Wallachia and Moldova.) (rulers) of the Romanian principalities. One of the earliest accounts belongs to the Saxon theologian and poet Johannes Sommer, who wrote in 1562–1563 that in the Principality of Moldavia, "the youth glorify the hospodar with the playing of the fluier".

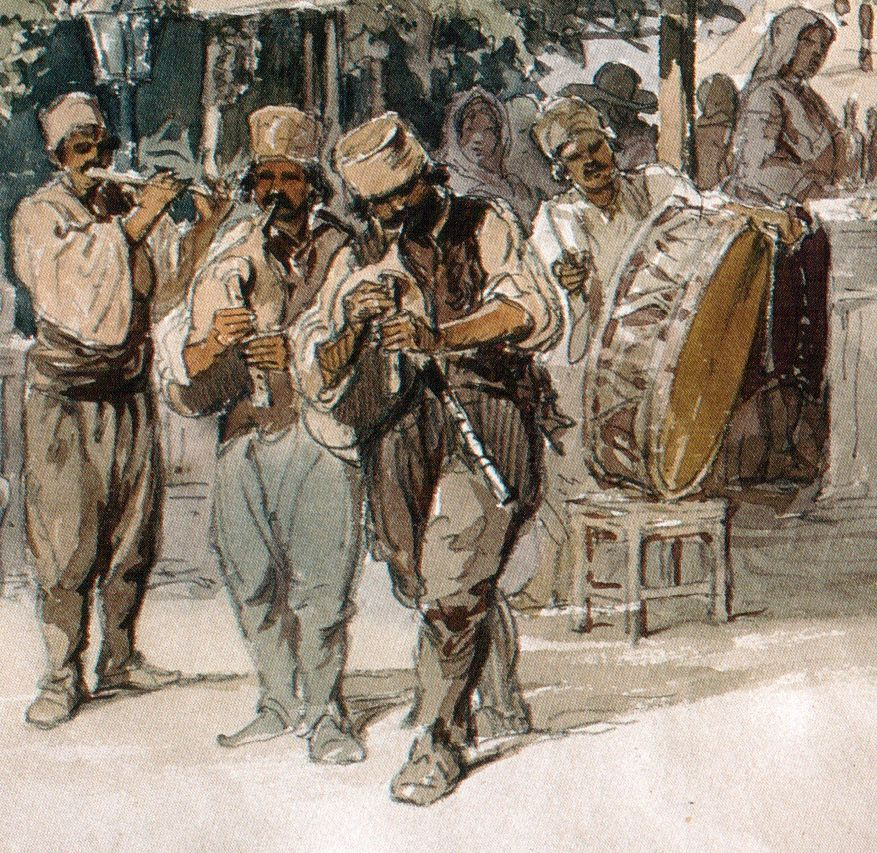
Musicians at the fair Târgul Moşilor, Bucharest (fragment), Amedeo Preziosi, 1869

By the 17th century, the fluier had gained a prominent place in court chamber ensembles. At the courts of hospodars Matei Basarab (1634–1654) and Vasile Lupu (1634–1653), its sound was an integral part of musical life. The traveler Paul of Aleppo, who visited Wallachia in 1653–1568, testified that at the hospodars' feasts, pieces performed with the "piercing voice of the fluiers" were invariably played. Fluier players (fluierași) were also part of court ensembles that performed colinde (carols) at Christmas and Epiphany.

Even as a courtly instrument, the fluier continued to be associated with its pastoral origins. The Moldavian hospodar and scholar Dimitrie Cantemir, in his allegorical novel Hieroglyphic History (1704), mentions the fluier several times, (Note: As fluier and şuier.) characterizing it specifically as a shepherd's instrument. This association with the pastoral environment persisted until the end of the 18th century: around 1776, the Polish envoy Karol Boscamp-Lasopolski noted that at a reception in Iași, Moldavian pieces were performed to the accompaniment of the shepherd's fluier – "an instrument very fashionable in this country." Gradually, towards the end of the century, the traditional repertoire at the courts began to be replaced by music of Ottoman, and later, Western European origin.

== Research ==
Systematic descriptions of Romanian folk instruments, including the fluier family, began to appear in the late 19th century. One of the first researchers was the archaeologist and folklorist Teodor Burada. In the early 20th century, the musicologist and music historian Mihail Poslușnicu wrote a historical overview of the fluier and other Romanian folk instruments in his book The History of Romanian Music. From the Renaissance to the Era of Artistic Culture Consolidation (1928).

The study of the fluier tradition was carried out by the Hungarian composer and folklorist Béla Bartók, as well as leading 20th-century Romanian ethnomusicologists – Constantin Brăiloiu, Tiberiu Alexandru, Ovidiu Papană, and others.

Synthesizing works on the organology and genre structure of the fluier tradition also appeared, including: Tiberiu Alexandru's monographs The Musical Instruments of the Romanian People (1956) and Romanian Folk Music (1975); Vasile Chiseliță's study Instrumental Music of Northern Bukovina. The Fluier Repertoire (2002); the collective monograph by Moldovan musicologists The Musical Art of Moldova. History and Modernity (2009); and the second volume of Ovidiu Papană's five-volume edition Romanian Folk Instruments. Musical-Acoustic Studies (2019).

Based on field recordings made by Constantin Brăiloiu and his colleagues in the 1930s and early 1940s, as well as later materials collected by the staff of the Institute of Ethnography and Folklore, a series of vinyl records and compact discs were released. These include authentic fluier music from both the pre-war period (recordings from the 1930s) and the post-war period (up to the 1960s). Among them are:

- Antologia muzicii populare româneşti (1960–1962) – a two-volume edition of folk melodies (six LPs, Electrecord label). It was accompanied by booklets in Romanian, English, French, and Russian, and was reissued in 1976.
- The Folk Music of Rumania (1963) – a compilation of Romanian folk music, co-edited with Alan Lomax based on the Folklore Archive as part of the Columbia World Library of Folk and Primitive Music series. The accompanying text was written in collaboration with A. L. Lloyd (one LP, Columbia Masterworks label).
- Roumanie. Musique de villages. 1. Olténie: Runc et les villages du Gorj. 2. Moldavie: Fundu Moldovei et la Bucovine. 3. Transylvanie: Drăguş et le Pays de l’Olt (1988) – a three-CD compilation (VDE-Gallo Records label) with a preface by Laurent Aubert and commentary by Speranța Rădulescu.

== Construction and classification ==
=== Varieties ===
The fluier family includes at least 17 structural varieties. They differ by several features: they can be single or double, end-blown, transverse or semi-transverse, open or equipped with a fipple, with a varying number of finger-holes – from five to eight or none at all. By size, fluiers are divided into small (up to 35 cm), medium (35–50 cm), and large (50 cm and above). They are made from various types of wood (ash, willow, plum, dogwood, hazel, elder, maple), as well as reed, and very rarely, bone. In the 20th century, metal (brass, copper, aluminum) and even plastic began to be used.

The diversity of forms within this family reflects the historico-typological evolution of the instrument – from the most archaic and simple variants (e.g., the tilinca and the Moldavian fipple-less fluier) to more technically advanced and later developments, such as the caval, the fipple fluier, double fluiers, and transverse flutes. In Romanian folk music, alongside traditional fluiers, borrowed wind instruments such as the nai (panpipes) and the ocarina are also found. Despite some common features with fluiers, they have a different structure and origin and are not considered part of the fluier family proper.

The fluier family
Name	Regional names	Number of finger holes	Size	Material	Area of distribution	Sound sample
Open semi-transverse fluiers (fipple-less)
Tilinca		–	large	wood	Northern Moldavia, Bukovina, northern Transilvania	Tilinca
Moldavian fluier	fluieraș, trișcă	6	small	wood, metal	Northern Moldavia, Bukovina, northern Transilvania	Moldavian fluier
Moldavian fluier	fluier	6	medium (Note: Less common.)	wood, metal	Northern Moldavia, Bukovina, northern Transilvania	Moldavian fluier
Moldavian fluier	fluier mare, fluier lung, caval	6	large	wood, metal	Northern Moldavia, Bukovina, northern Transilvania	Large Moldavian Fluier
Dobrujan fluier		7 (Note: Seventh on the back side.)	small	wood, reed	Dobruja	
Dobrujan fluier		7	medium	wood, reed	Dobruja	
Bulgarian kaval		8 (Note: Eighth on the back side.)	large (Note: Consists of three parts.)	wood, reinforced with bone	Dobruja	Bulgarian Kaval
Closed end-blown fipple-less fluiers
Fifa	dudină, șuieraș	–	small	lignified plant stalks wood	Northern Oltenia	Fifa
End-blown fluiers with a fipple
Tilinca with a fipple		–	large	wood (very rarely metal or bone)	Maramureș	
Caval		5	large	wood (very rarely metal or bone)	Oltenia, Muntenia, Dobruja, southern Moldavia	Кавал
Fluier with a fipple	fluieraș, trișcă	6	small	wood (very rarely metal or bone)	Entire Romanian cultural area; most popular in Oltenia, Muntenia, Dobruja, southern Moldavia	Fluier with fipple
Fluier with a fipple		6	medium	wood (very rarely metal or bone)	Entire Romanian cultural area; most popular in Oltenia, Muntenia, Dobruja, southern Moldavia	Fluier with fipple
Fluier with a fipple	fluier mare, fluieroi	6	large	wood (very rarely metal or bone)	Entire Romanian cultural area; most popular in Oltenia, Muntenia, Dobruja, southern Moldavia	Fluier with fipple
Fluier with a fipple		7 (Note: Seventh hole on the back side. Rare.)	small	wood (very rarely metal or bone)	Timișoara region	
Double fluier (with pipes of equal length)		6	small	wood (very rarely metal or bone)	Entire Romanian cultural area	Double fluier
Double fluier (with pipes of equal length)		6	medium	wood (very rarely metal or bone)	Entire Romanian cultural area	Double fluier
Double fluier (with pipes of equal length)		7 (Note: Seventh hole on the drone pipe. Rare.)	small	wood (very rarely metal or bone)	Entire Romanian cultural area	Double fluier
Double fluier (with pipes of equal length)		6+6 (Note: Six holes on each pipe. Rare.)	small	wood (very rarely metal or bone)	Entire Romanian cultural area	
Double fluier (with pipes of equal length)		6+6	medium	wood (very rarely metal or bone)	Entire Romanian cultural area	
Double fluier (with a short drone pipe)		6	small	wood (very rarely metal or bone)	Vrancea region	
Double fluier (with a short drone pipe)		6	medium	wood (very rarely metal or bone)	Vrancea region	
Transverse fluiers
Folk flute	piculină	6	small	wood	Eastern Oltenia	Piculina
Folk flute	flaut	6 or 7 (Note: All seven on the front side.)	large	wood	Eastern Oltenia	

=== Open semi-transverse fluiers (fipple-less) ===
==== Tilinca ====
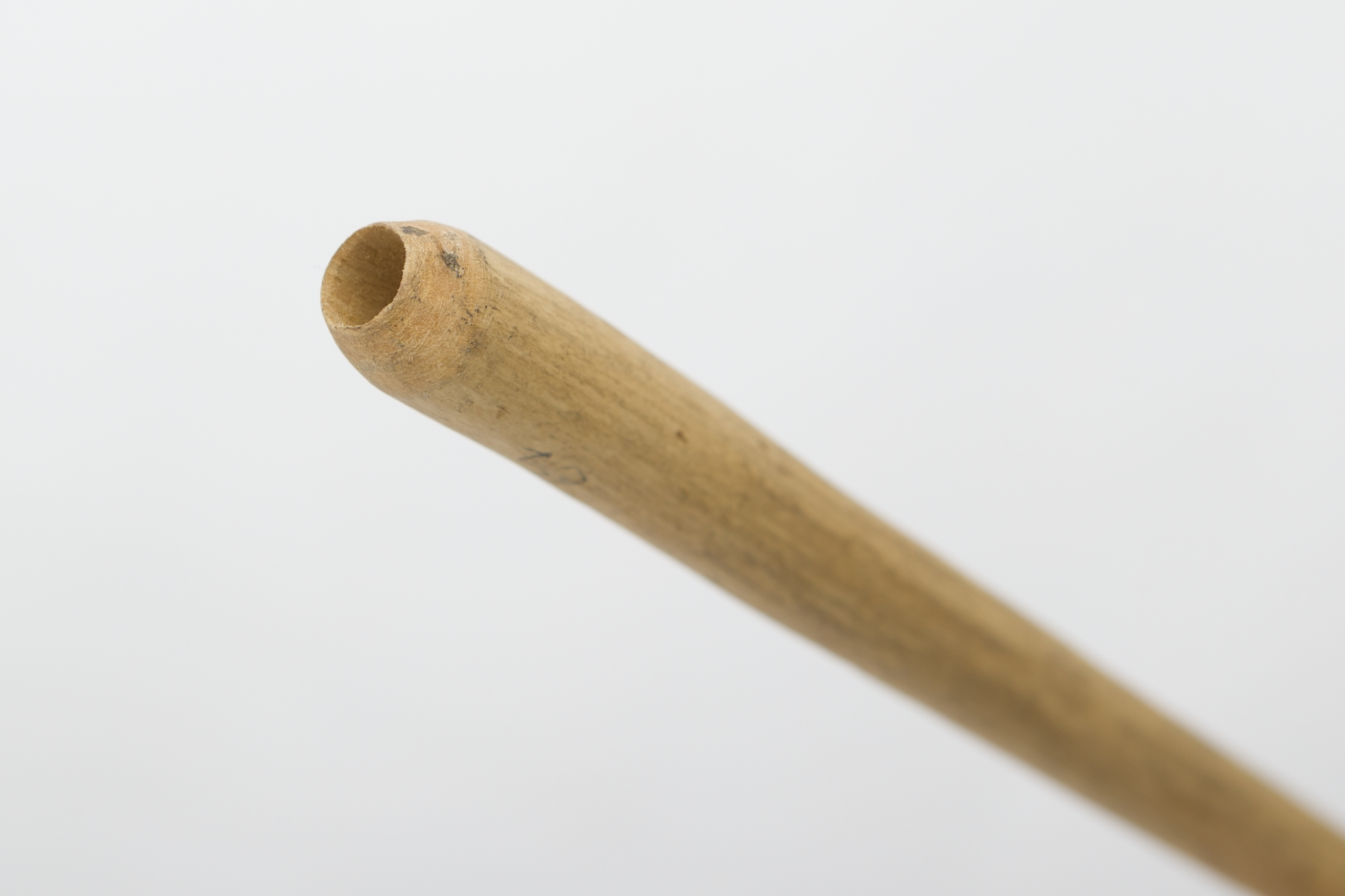
Tilinca, master Mihai Lăcătuș (Bukovina, third quarter of the 20th century)

The tilinca (Romanian: tilincă or telincă, cf. Ukrainian telenka) is the simplest Romanian fluier, having no finger-holes and no fipple. The instrument is a tube made of wood (willow, maple, elder) or bark, open at both ends. Its length ranges from 65 to 80 cm. The melody is created exclusively by varying the strength of the air stream (overblowing), which allows the overtones of the natural harmonic series to be produced, and also by partially or completely closing the lower end of the tube with a finger. Before playing, the instrument should be thoroughly soaked in water to ensure uniform moisture and wall consistency. The timbre of the tilinca is described as high, whistling, and with a characteristic sharpness. Despite its primitive construction, virtuoso performers can play not only doinas but also complex songs and dances on the tilinca. By the mid-20th century, this archaic instrument had become rare, found mainly in Bukovina, northern Moldavia, and Transylvania. The concert and educational activities of Bukovinian master and folk musician Mihai Lăcătuș helped save the tilinca from oblivion, contributing to the preservation and gradual revival of its performance tradition in the region.

==== Moldavian fluier ====
Open semi-transverse fluiers with six finger-holes (fluier fără dop) are common in the northern part of the historical region of Moldavia, as well as partially in northern Transylvania. Tiberiu Alexandru called this type the Moldavian fluier (fluier moldovenesc).

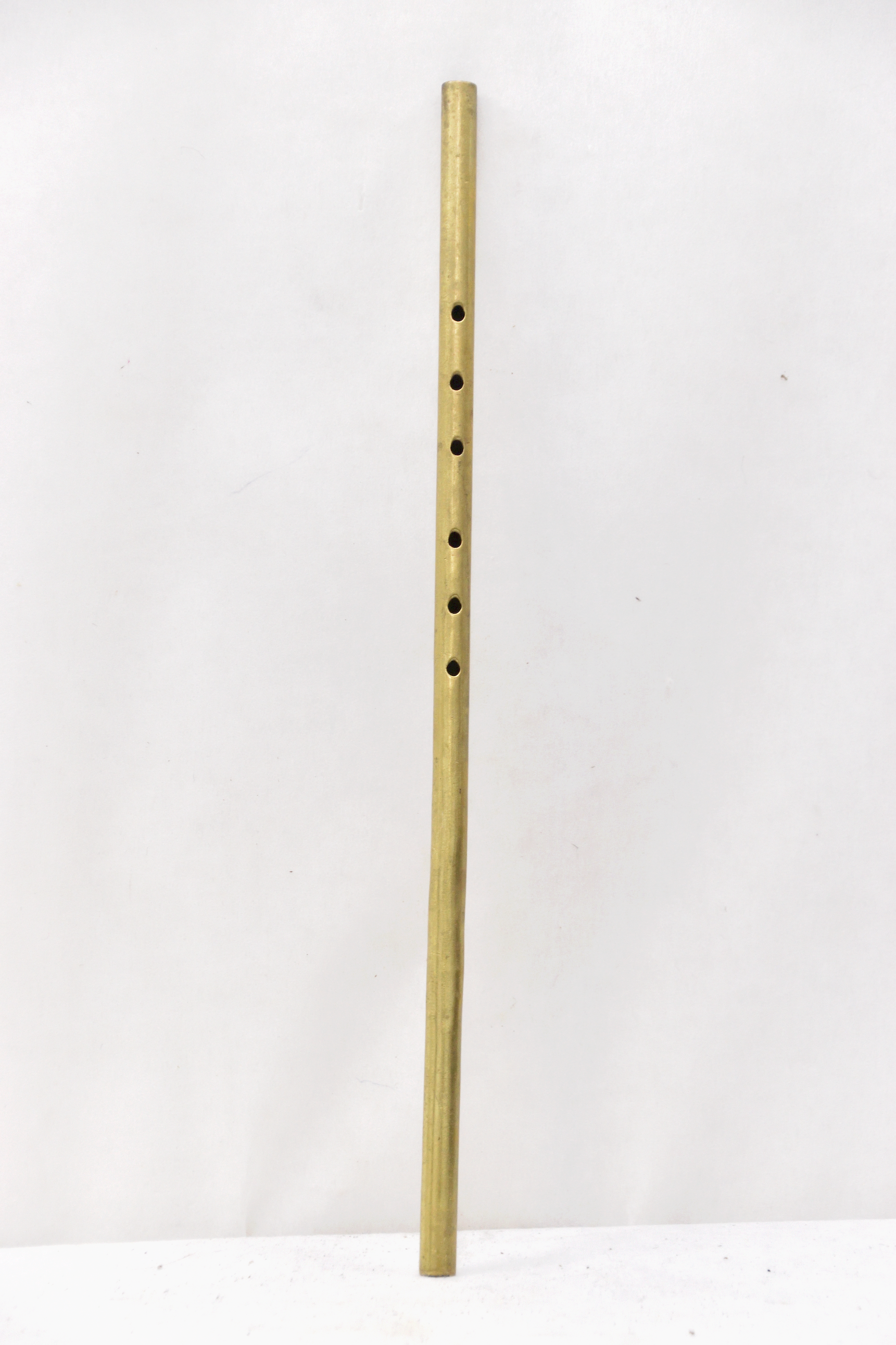
Large Moldavian fluier (copper, Bukovina, first quarter of the 20th century)

The instrument is a cylindrical tube with open ends and a semi-transverse (oblique) embouchure, without a fipple. It is made predominantly of wood, less often of metal. Small, medium (less common), and large varieties exist.

In the north and northwest of Romanian Bukovina, the small fluier is called a fluieraș, while the large instrument is called a fluier mare (Romanian for "large fluier"). In central Moldavia, the small instrument may be called a trișcă, and the large one a caval, by analogy with the Oltenian caval. In Ukrainian Bukovina, Moldavian fluiers of increased length (50–80 cm and more) are called long fluiers or large fluiers (fluier lung, fluier mare). The term "small fluier" (fluier mic) refers to instruments measuring 25–35 cm in length. The term "caval" is not found in the Northern Bukovinian tradition.

Unlike the more common fipple flutes, the Moldavian fluier requires the performer to form an air stream with the lips, directing it onto the edge of the hole. This allows for a rich timbral palette, fine dynamics, and expressiveness. The sound of the Moldavian fluier is typically softer, warmer, and richer in overtones, whereas fipple flutes produce a bright, stable, but less flexible sound.

The fipple-less fluier is considered a more archaic form compared to the instrument with a fipple. Researchers view the Moldavian fluier as a transitional form between the tilinca and the more widespread fipple fluiers.

==== Dobrujan fluier ====
The Dobrujan fluier (Romanian: fluier dobrogean) is a fipple-less fluier common in the Dobruja region. Unlike the Moldavian fluier, which has six finger-holes on the front, the Dobrujan fluier is equipped with seven holes: six on the front and one additional on the back, slightly above the sixth. Opening the back hole typically raises the fundamental tone by an octave. The instrument is usually made of reed.

==== Bulgarian kaval ====
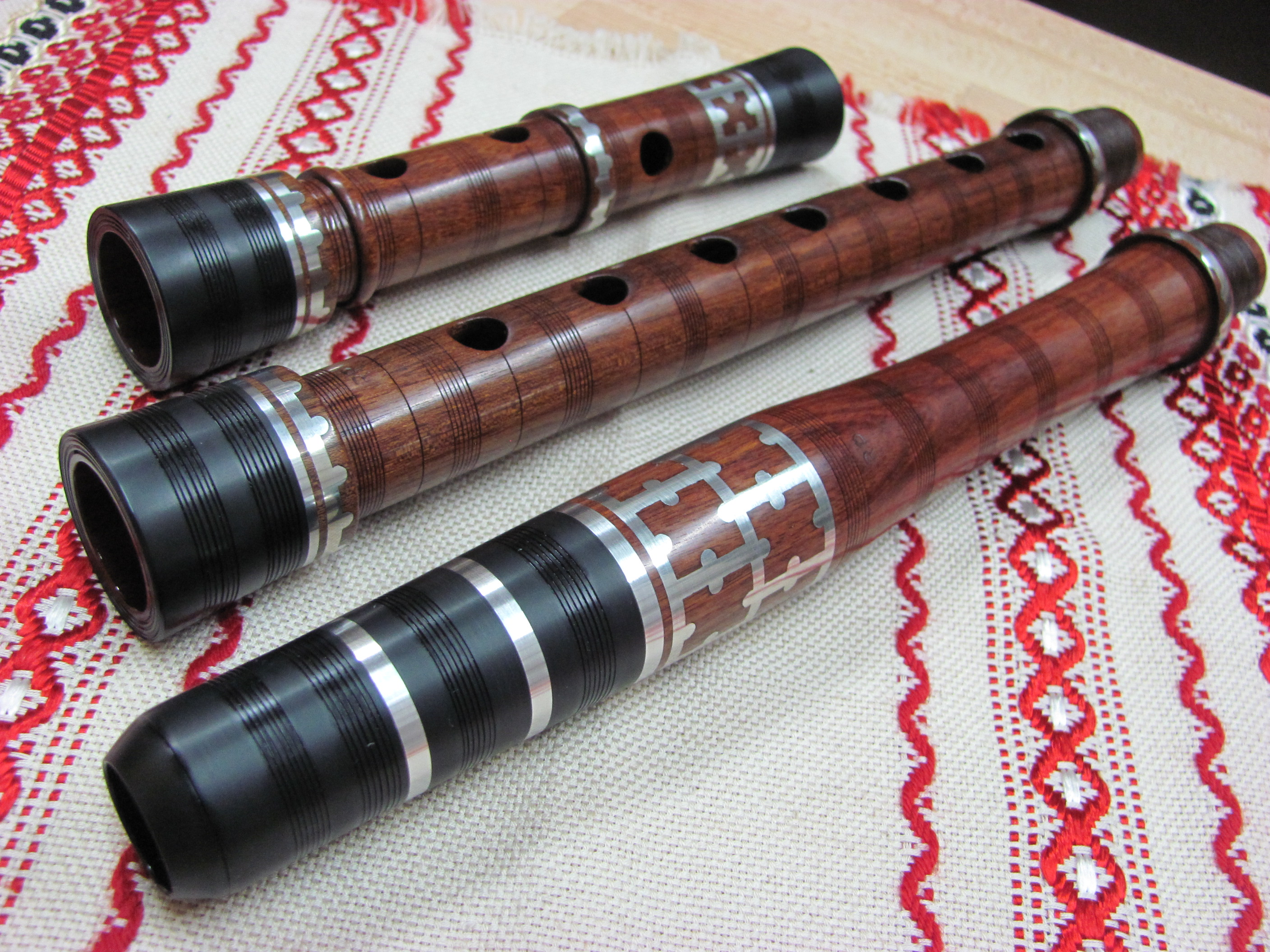
Bulgarian kaval

In Dobruja, Romanians also play the Bulgarian kaval (Romanian: caval bulgăresc). This instrument, 65–90 cm long, consists of three tubes fitted into one another, secured at the joints with rings of ox horn. The upper section (26–27 cm) (nearest camera) has an opening for blowing air that has a beveled edge around its entire circumference, in common with most fipple-less flutes. It connects to the main tube (25–27 cm), which has seven finger-holes cut on one side, either equidistant or in two groups of three and four (from top to bottom). On the opposite side, above the others, is a left thumb hole. The right thumb supports the instrument. The main tube is inserted into the lower section (21–25 cm), which has four open holes: two inline with finger-holes and two opposite each other on either side, located at three different distances from the bottom edge (between 7 and 23 cm).

=== Closed end-blown fipple-less fluiers ===
==== Fifa ====
The fifa (Romanian: fifa) is a type of fluier found in certain areas of Oltenia (southern Romania). It is a unitonal (one-note) fluier traditionally played by young unmarried girls. Playing the fifa alternates with vocal calls of hăulit, which resemble yodeling in sound.

=== End-blown fipple fluiers ===
==== Tilinca with a fipple ====
This variety of the tilinca is equipped with a fipple, which significantly facilitates sound production compared to the open version. Like the fipple-less tilinca, it has no finger-holes, and the melody is played exclusively by overblowing, based on the sequential production of overtones of the natural harmonic series. This type of instrument was described by Béla Bartók in 1913 in Maramureș.

==== Caval ====
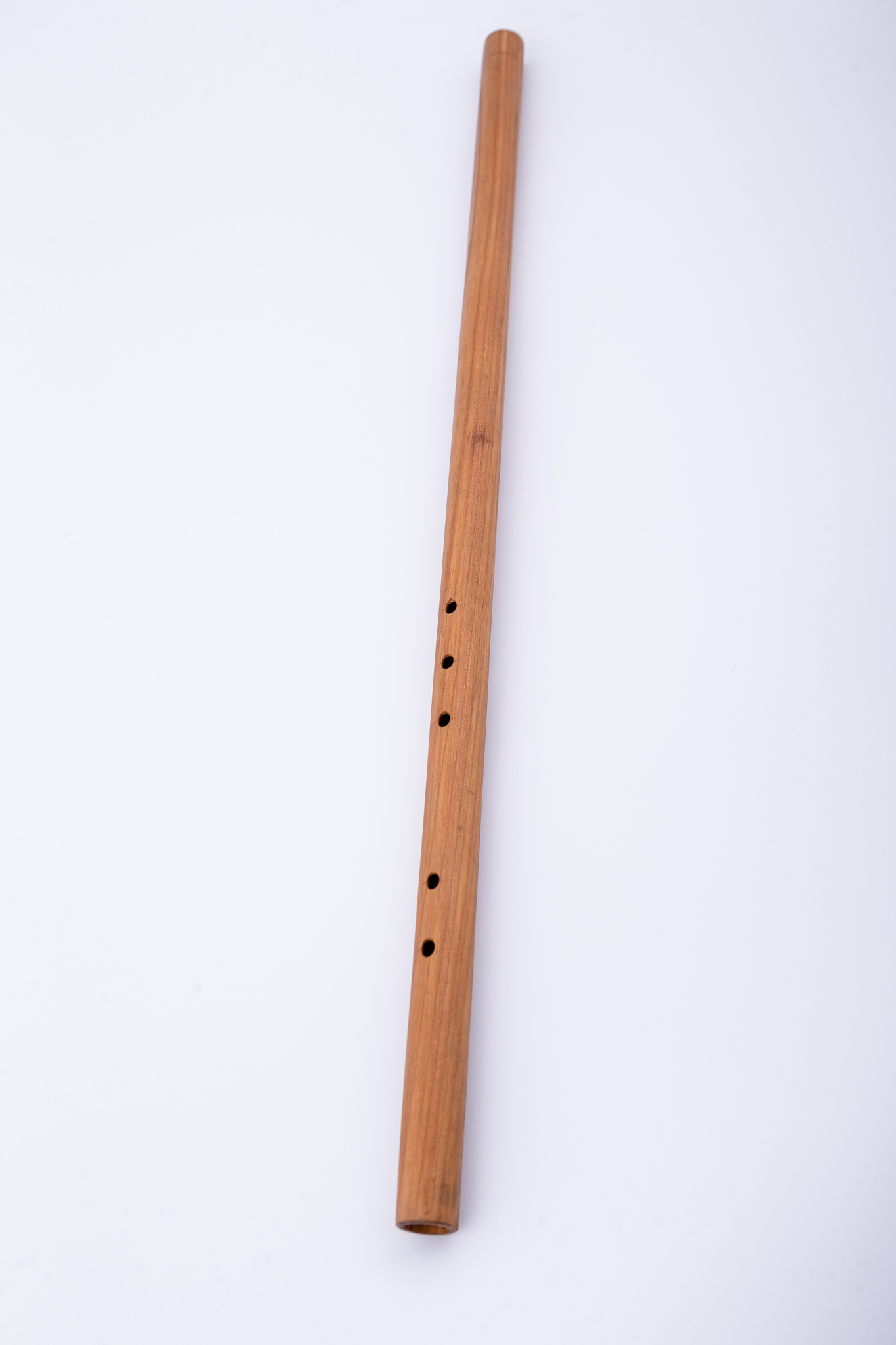
Caval, master Ion Costache (Teleorman, Oltenia; no later than 1933)

The Romanian caval is common in Oltenia, Muntenia, Dobruja, and the southern part of Moldavia. The instrument is made of wood, has a cylindrical tube, and five finger-holes, which are always grouped (from bottom to top) in two sets of two and three. The distance from the lower end of the caval to the first finger-hole is slightly greater than the distance from it to the third; the distance between the groups of holes – that is, between the second and third hole – is slightly greater than the sum of the distances between the other holes, and the distance from the lower end to the fifth hole is slightly more than half the length of the fluier.

Like any fluier with finger-holes, the caval produces a fundamental tone when all holes are closed, and a scale when the holes are successively opened from the bottom up. Because there are only five holes, the resulting scale is limited to six notes and is incomplete; it can be raised by an octave or more by increasing the force of the air stream. Due to its limited range (usually within a sixth, and sometimes less), not every melody can be played on the caval. The timbre of the caval is soft, velvety, somewhat gentle and sad, and it imparts this character to the melodies played on it. It is most often used to play slow pieces: doinas, songs in free rhythm (rubato), and calm dance melodies.

Some performers use a technique called "playing with the lip" (Romanian: cântarea cu buză). This technique consists of partially covering the fipple's window (vrană) with the lower lip. This position not only allows for a greater volume of sound due to a stronger exhalation, but also changes the timbre: the instrument sounds slightly lower, and the sound acquires the character of a delicate frullato, resembling the sound of reed instruments, such as the clarinet or the tárogató.

==== Fluier with a fipple ====
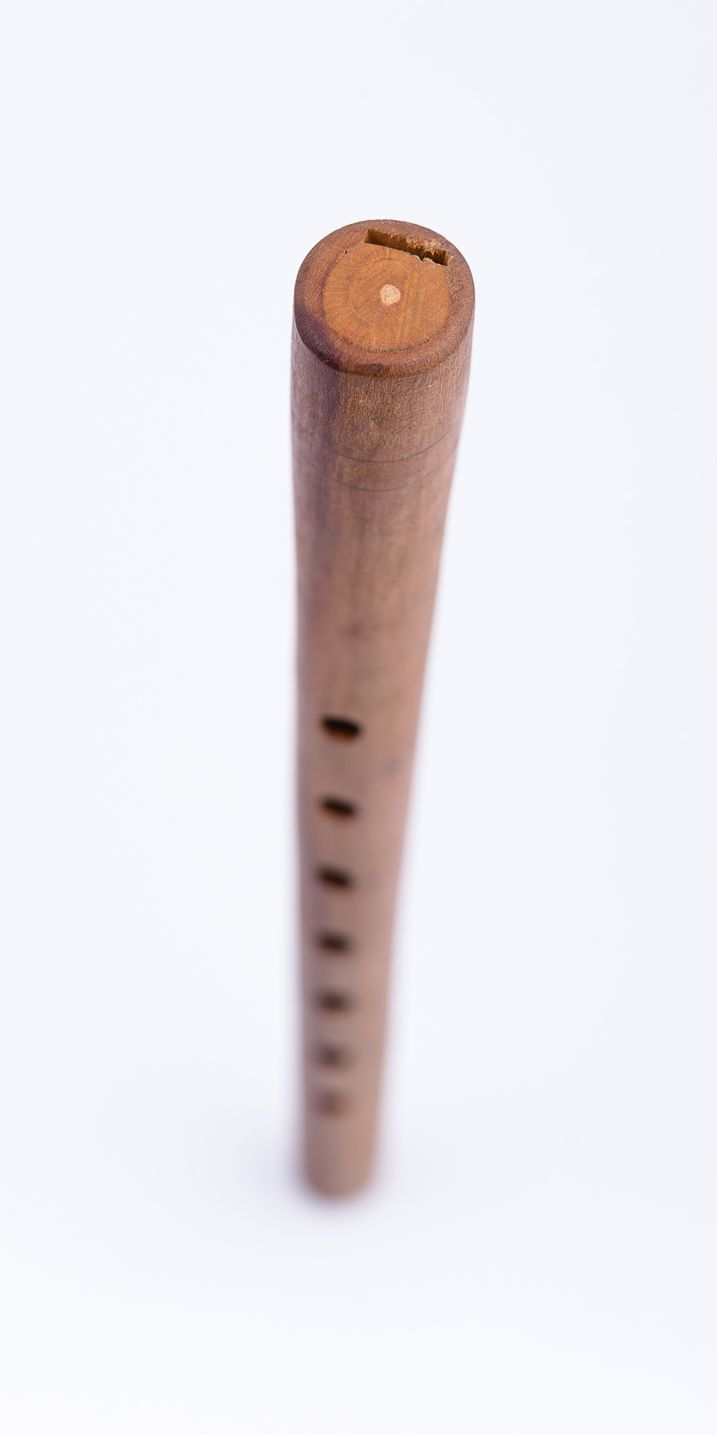
Fluier with fipple, master Radu Lăbunț (Vrancea, Moldova; second half of the 20th century)

The fluier with a fipple and six finger-holes (Romanian: fluier cu dop) is the most numerous type of Romanian folk flute. It is common throughout the entire Romanian cultural area and is most popular in Oltenia, Muntenia, Dobruja, and southern Moldavia. Its key feature is the presence of a fipple, which significantly facilitates sound production compared to fipple-less flutes. The fipple (dop, Romanian for "plug") closes the upper end of the tube, which is usually thicker, leaving a narrow rectangular air channel (0.6–0.8 cm long and 0.1–0.15 cm wide) known as the "light" (lumină), "eye" (ochi), or "breather" (răsuflătoare). At a distance of 1.5–2 cm from the top, on the side opposite the finger-holes, a rectangular or square window (vrană) is cut. The lower edge of the window is sharply beveled and is called the "lip" or "tongue" (limbă). As the air passes through the channel, it is split by this sharp edge, creating vibration and thus sound.

Fipple flutes are almost always made of wood. The outer profile of the tube is slightly conical, and the finger-holes are most often oval, arranged in two groups of three. The distance from the lower end of the fluier to the first finger-hole is greater than the distance between the other holes (up to twice the distance, rarely more), and slightly greater than the distance between the two groups of holes. The sixth hole is located approximately halfway between the window's lip (limba vranei) and the lower end of the tube. At the lower end, the tube is left with thicker walls for a short distance or is closed with a plug (fund, Romanian for "bottom"), which leaves a small central hole about 0.5 cm in diameter.

In Oltenia, Muntenia, Dobruja, and southern Moldavia, it is called a fluier. In Banat and the adjacent areas of Transylvania and Oltenia, it is called fluieră. In Bukovina, northern Moldavia, and most of Transylvania, it is called trișcă. (Note: Alexandru noted that the existence of two or more names for the same instrument, as well as the same term designating different instruments, is a common phenomenon in the world of Romanian folk instruments. Alexandru 1956, p. 105) The most common types are the small instruments, sometimes referred to as fluieraș or trișcuţa, and the medium ones. The large ones (in Transylvania, fluieroi or fluieran) are rarer. They are primarily used in the Sibiu, Hunedoara, and northern Oltenia regions.

When played, the instrument is held straight, unlike semi-transverse and transverse flutes. The tongue plays an important role in performance. To create detached, clear sounds (staccato), especially in dance music, performers coordinate finger movements with tongue strikes that rhythmically block the air channel. Alexandru quotes a fluier player from Vrancea: "When the finger strikes, the tongue strikes too." Sometimes performers play two identical fluiers simultaneously, holding them in their mouths and playing the melody in unison.

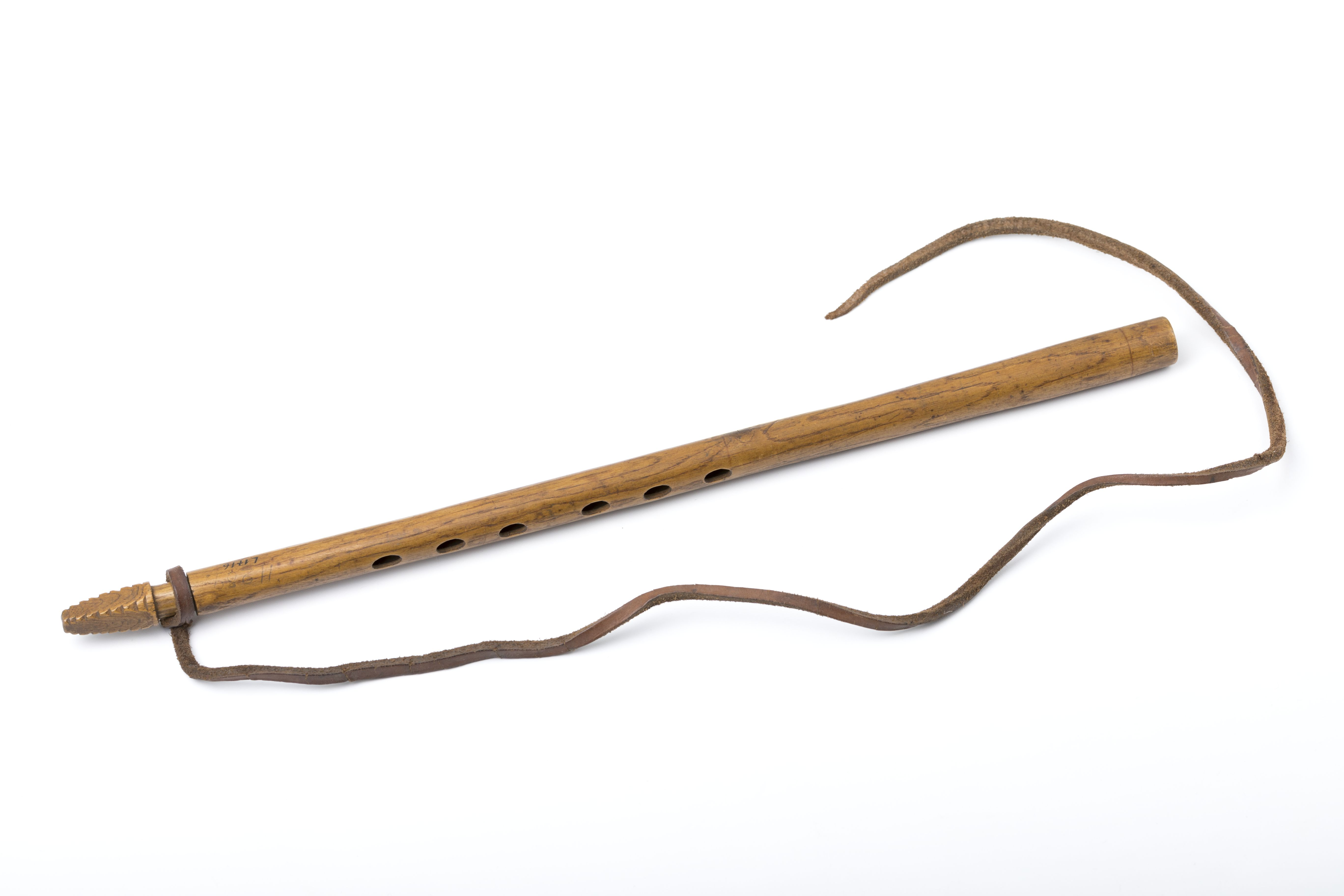
Fluier-whip, first half of the 20th century

Occasionally, a fipple fluier is built into the upper part of a shepherd's staff (fluier în botă, Romanian for "fluier in a club"). The tube runs inside the staff; its lower end has a small oblique channel that exits to the surface through a hole in the staff's wall. This hole is analogous to the lower end of a regular fluier and is located on the opposite side of the finger-holes. Below the built-in fluier, the staff continues to its normal length and shape. This design combines two essential items of shepherd life – the staff as a utilitarian tool and the fluier as a musical instrument. There is also a fluier-whip (fluier bici), in which the fluier serves as the whip handle. Fluiers from the Vrancea region may have a special protrusion with a hole (toartă) on the back of the tube, designed for tying the instrument to a belt, for example.

==== Double fluier ====
The double fluier (Romanian: fluier gemănat; also known as gemene; îngemănate; cu două vreni; cu două ţevi; fluieroaică; trişcă) consists of two fipple flutes joined (cf. double flute). Such instruments are made either from a single piece of wood or by joining two separate tubes. Double fluiers are relatively rare, partly due to the complexity of their manufacture and their higher cost compared to regular fluiers.

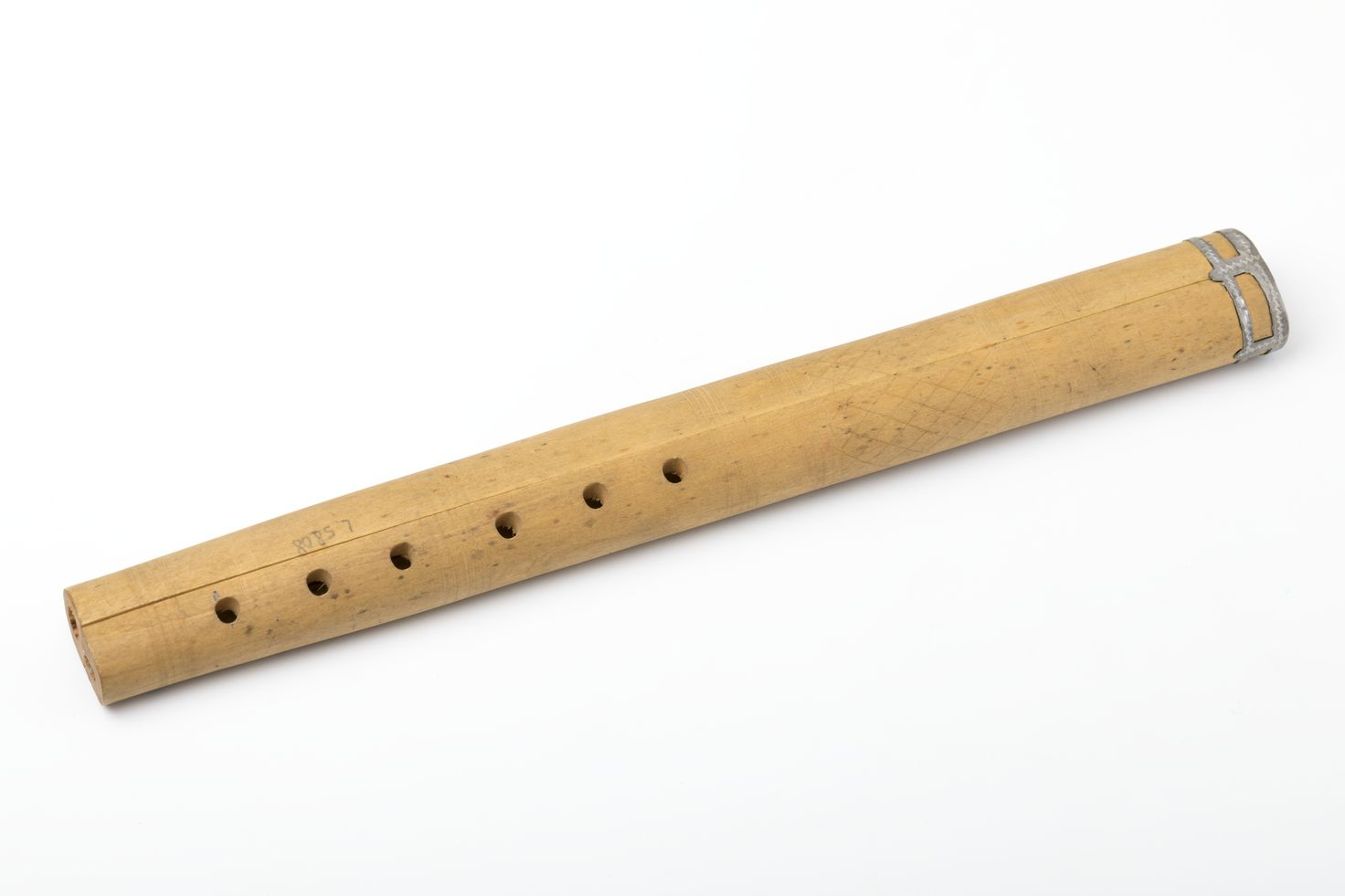
Double fluier (Hodac, Transylvania; third quarter of the 20th century)

Typically, in a double fluier, one tube has six finger-holes and is used for playing the melody, while the second, of the same length and without holes, produces a continuous drone tone. In terms of playing technique, such an instrument is close to the widespread fipple fluier with six holes and does not require special training. Varieties with seven holes or with a shortened drone pipe are rarer. If both tubes are of the same length, the second (without holes) produces a drone in unison with the fundamental tone of the melody pipe; if it is half as long, it sounds an octave higher. Occasionally, double fluiers are found where both tubes are equipped with six finger-holes.

=== Transverse fluiers ===
In some parts of eastern Oltenia, folk transverse flutes are found. The large examples are called flutes (Romanian: flaut), and the small ones are called piculină. They are tubes closed at one end, near which an embouchure hole is cut into the wall. On the same side are six or seven finger-holes; on large flutes, they are often grouped in two sets (3+3 or 4+3).

During performance, the instrument is held in a transverse position relative to the player's body. The playing technique on folk flutes and piculinas is analogous to that of modern transverse flutes: the sound is produced by splitting the air stream directed by the player against the edge of the hole. The characteristic guttural hum that accompanies traditional fluier performance is also found when playing these instruments.

== Manufacturing ==
Fluiers of all types are made either by the performers themselves or, more often, by village craftsmen. There are well-known centers of fluier production, such as the village of Hodac in central Transylvania, where in the 1950s, about ninety semi-professional peasant craftsmen produced over 100,000 instruments annually. Most of them sold their products themselves, traveling with bags full of flutes to fairs. In the 1980s, the craftsmen of Hodac were producing over 200,000 fluiers of various types per year, working exclusively in their spare time.

The craftsmen of Hodac make instruments with a fipple primarily from goat willow wood, less often from privet, and by special order, from plum or ash. The raw material is harvested in autumn from fresh, knot-free branches, which are already called "fluiers" right after being cut. Slightly curved branches are heated and straightened.

The work involves a set of traditional tools: a small saw (ferez, firastău), a drill (sfleder), a chisel with a curved tip (cosor), a small carving knife with a sharp triangular blade (cuțitaș), a small half-round chisel (dăltuță), and measuring sticks (măsuri) of various sizes for marking the holes.

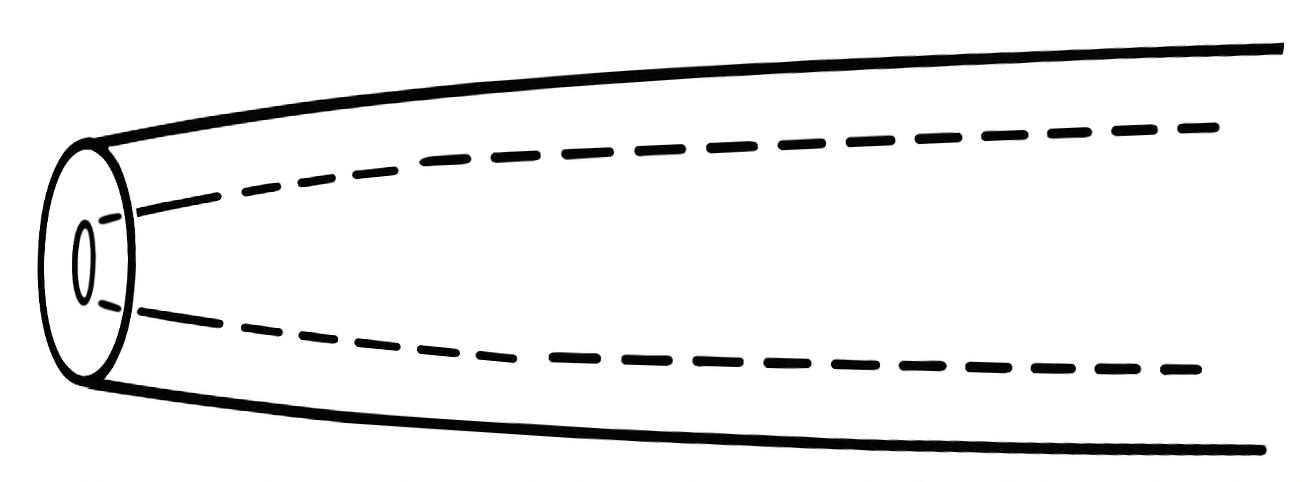
The lower end of a fluier with a fipple

The manufacturing process includes several key stages:

- Drilling and drying. A through-hole is drilled in the raw branch, with the internal channel of the tube becoming much narrower at the lower end. The tube is then stripped of its bark and dried, after which the channel is re-drilled to correct for shrinkage.
- Metal casting. Decorative grooves are cut into the head of the fluier, after which it is bound with a molten alloy of two parts lead and one part tin. The molten metal is poured into the grooves, and after it cools, the excess is cut away.
- Creating the fipple. This is the most delicate operation. A small round hole is first cut with a chisel, which is then shaped into a rectangular window – the vrană – with a carving knife. The lower edge of the vrană, the lip (limbă), is sharply beveled.
- Making the plug. A plug (dop) is carved from a willow branch to fit the channel's diameter precisely. A small channel is cut into it, which, together with the wall of the fluier, forms the windway. The plug is inserted, the master tests if the fluier sounds, and then the plug is cut flush with the end of the instrument. The gap between the plug and the lip of the vrană must be "no thicker than a hair."
- Cutting the finger holes. The locations for the holes are marked using a measuring stick or calculated with a string. The holes themselves are cut with a chisel, finished with a carving knife, and smoothed with an awl. Their shape can be oval or round. Masters note that the accuracy of the distances between the holes is more important than their size.

When marking and cutting the finger holes, craftsmen generally do not strive for standardized precision. As a result, the scale of each fluier is individual, and instruments can differ even when made by the same craftsman using the same measurements. Only a few makers produce fluiers with a unified tuning, orienting themselves to a tuning fork. Due to these individual characteristics, performers become accustomed to their own instrument and are generally reluctant to use another's.

Greater attention is paid to decorative finishing: the instruments are adorned with carvings, paintings, metal or bark wrappings, and bone inlays. Such fluiers are valuable examples of folk applied art.

Alongside traditional peasant craftsmanship, modern artisanal (manufactory) production of fluiers also exists in Romania. In contrast to folk masters, who work within the framework of rural life and rely on personal practical experience and inherited techniques, such enterprises combine manual labor with standardized processes to achieve uniform quality and tuning. One example is the Hora factory, which grew out of a small workshop founded in 1951. Its product range includes small fipple fluiers made of sycamore maple. Another well-known manufacturer is Fabrica de caval (Romanian for "The Caval Factory"), which produces cavals, fipple fluiers, double fluiers, and tilincas.

== Role in folk culture ==
The fluier is the most widespread and revered folk instrument in Romania and Moldova. In traditional culture, it is perceived not only as a musical medium but also as a means of emotional expression, comfort, and alleviation of heartache. Skilled fluier players enjoyed special respect and high social status in rural communities. This attitude is largely due to sacral beliefs about the origin and purpose of the instrument, which persist in the popular consciousness. According to one legend, the fluier has a divine origin: "God created the fluier and the sheep, while the devil made the cimpoi (Note: Romanian bagpipe.) and the goat" (Dumnezeu a făcut fluierul şi oaia, în timp ce diavolul a făcut cimpoiul şi capra). Another version states: "When God was on earth, he herded sheep. He made the fluier and hid it under the sheep's wool, and the shepherds found it during shearing" (Dumnezeu când a fost pe pământ a păscut oile. El a făcut fluierul şi l-a pus sub lâna oii, iar la tunsul oilor ciobanii au dat de dânsul). In accordance with this tradition, the fluier is considered a consecrated instrument, which is permitted to be played even during Lent.

Magical properties are attributed to the music of the fluier: its sound is believed to symbolize the connection between man and the cosmos. The performance, especially when accompanied by a guttural drone, is perceived as a form of sacred communication – between man and the divine, between the community and ancestors. Such music is considered more "natural" and unrelated to other musical traditions, especially that of the lăutari.

The magical significance of the fluier is also reflected in traditional poetic texts – for example, in a Transylvanian colinda about a shepherd's funeral:

My dear fluier – at my head, Dug into the earth, its mouth to the wind When the wind blows – the fluier will sing, When the storm rises – it will start a doina.	Fluierul meu drag mi-l puneți la cap Înfipt in mormânt, cu dopul la vânt Vântul de-o trăgăna, fluieru-a cânta. Vânt de-o vâjâi, fluieru-o hori.

== Musical repertoire ==
As autochthonous instruments, fluiers are primarily associated with archaic monophonic genres – shepherd signals, doinas, and bocets. In contrast, later or borrowed instruments, such as the nai, cobza, or violin, are mainly used to perform dance and urban music. These differences are also reflected in performance styles: traditional fluiers are characterized by free rhythm, developed ornamentation, and a variable monophonic texture – from simple monody to primitive heterophony, typical of the oldest layers of folklore. In contrast, for example, violin performance in the folk lăutari tradition is distinguished by a clear rhythm, chordal sound, and the presence of accompaniment, bringing it closer to professional stage music.

The music performed on shepherd's fluiers forms a special and distinctive layer of the traditional instrumental heritage. Its character is largely determined by the construction of the instruments themselves. The richness of the melody depends on the type of instrument and the skill of the performer. The repertoire, born in direct connection with the daily life of shepherds, includes tunes for various purposes.

=== Ritual and work-related tunes ===
Some melodies are associated with daily work; their ancient, often magical, significance has been lost over time. Such tunes bear names related to milk processing: Când mulge oile ("When the sheep are milked"), La măsurat ("At the measuring of the milk"), La închegatul laptelui ("At the curdling of the milk"), A caşului ("For the making of caș" (Note: Romanian: Caș is a type of fresh, unsalted sheep's cheese.)). These melodies are characterized by their simplicity and are built on the repetition of short formulas, having an incantatory character.

=== Shepherd's road and pasture melodies ===
An important category consists of the so-called road tunes (ale drumului), which accompanied the movement of flocks – both during transhumance (seasonal migration from mountain pastures to lowlands and back in seasonal pastoralism) and during daily transitions between the sheepfold and pasture. The melody Porneala ("The Departure") was played at the moment the flock set out. A series of accompanying road melodies (șireaguri) includes, for example: Când urcă oile la munte ("When the sheep go up the mountain"), Când pleacă oile din târlă ("When the sheep leave the fold"), and others. The grazing period has its own specific tunes, such as Când pasc oile pe coastă ("When the sheep graze on the slope"). It was believed that the sound of the fluier contributes to the calm demeanor of the flock: upon hearing the instrument, the animals feel the shepherd's presence and graze without anxiety.

Both road and pasture melodies are often instrumental versions of the doina. They are characterized by free rhythm, rich ornamentation, long musical phrases, and repeating melodic formulas. Large fluiers are typically used for doinas and slow melodies. This is a special type of bucolic instrumental music, distinguished from vocal doinas by its function. These melodies have a utilitarian purpose: born in close connection with the shepherd's life, they simultaneously facilitate labor and give it an artistic form. The shepherd's environment also gave rise to a true instrumental poem – the musical tale of the shepherd who lost his flock.

=== The fluier as a means of communication ===
In Bukovina and northern Moldavia, a limited set of melodies existed that performed a signal function and served as a means of communication among unmarried youth. This repertoire includes, for example, the melodies "When I went to the girls" (Când mergeam la fete) and "When I returned from the girls" (Când veneam de la fete). In the recent past, this practice also had an initiatory character.

=== Ritual use ===
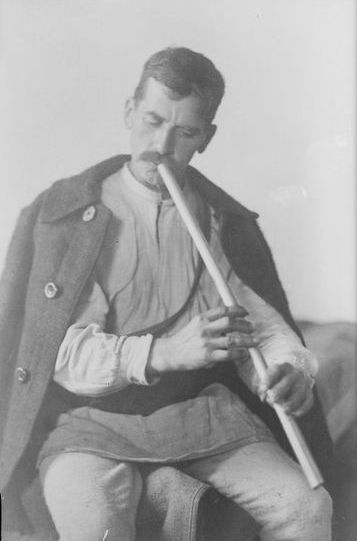
Performer on a large Moldavian fluier (photo by Adolphe A. Chevallier, first half of the 20th century)

In some regions, the fluier is used in funeral rituals. In Bukovina, female laments (bocets) sometimes intertwine with the sound of the large fluier (fluier mare). Invited musicians play doinas and songs of sorrow at the wake during the night; and at the coffin, if custom allows, they perform bocets. When the fluier duplicates the female voice, its melody usually follows with a slight delay, creating a heterophonic effect. In Țara Hațegului (Transylvania), one to four performers played on large fluiers (fluieroaie) at funerals.

The use of the fluier in wedding ceremonies has been preserved in northern Moldavia and Bukovina. The repertoire includes the bride's laments and songs about the dowry (Cântecul miresei, La zestre, Cântecul nevestelor).

The fluier is also part of the calendrical rituals of northern Moldavia and Bukovina – Christmas colindas, theatrical winter performances with masks such as the Capra and the Bear Dance (Jocul ursului, cf. Leading the bear).

=== Dance accompaniment ===
In traditional peasant culture, the fluier, along with the cimpoi, was a key instrument for accompanying village dances (Romanian: hora). The situation began to change in the second half of the 19th century. After the abolition of Roma slavery in the Romanian principalities, the function of dance accompaniment gradually passed to professional lăutari musicians, in whose ensembles the violin took the leading role. Consequently, in most regions, the fluier lost its importance as a dance instrument. The exception was Bukovina, where the fluier was part of traditional lăutari tarafs. (Note: In Bukovina and several other regions (Banat, Maramureș, and Transylvania), the participation of Romanian musicians in lăutari tarafs was traditionally high, whereas in other regions, the tarafs were predominantly composed of Roma musicians. (Chiseliță 2009a, p. 79)) The most famous example is Ilie Cazacu and the Sidor Andronicescu taraf, whose first recordings were made by Constantin Brăiloiu in the 1930s.

=== Music for listening ===
Unlike signal or ritual tunes, music for listening (Romanian: muzică de ascultare) has no utilitarian function and is intended primarily for aesthetic appreciation. It is typically performed solo, has a personal, improvisational character, and provides the performer with an opportunity to express their own emotions and skill. This repertoire includes the musical poem "When the shepherd lost his sheep," instrumental ballads, doinas, and lyric songs.

== In stage folklore ==
After World War II, in Romania and Moldova, following the Soviet model, the formation of professional folk music orchestras began. Although the fluier traditionally belonged to shepherd culture and was primarily a solo instrument (with the rare exception of Bukovinian lăutari tarafs), it was actively integrated into stage-oriented folklore practice.

A telling example is the career of the Oltenian peasant musician Marin Chisăr, who knew hundreds of local melodies and played the fluier in a traditional manner. In 1941, he was recorded by Constantin Brăiloiu and his colleagues. After the war, Chisăr began performing in Bucharest with large professional folk orchestras. The conductors of these orchestras sought to eliminate or tone down features of authentic performance deemed "unaesthetic." As a result, Chisăr had to abandon the characteristic guttural drone, which he could no longer produce in his later years. The asymmetrical and free rhythms typical of traditional fluier playing were also criticized. Adaptation to academic standards proved challenging: the soloist and the orchestra often fell out of sync due to mismatched tempos.

Other famous performers of this period in Romania include Dumitru Zamfira (Oltenia), Silvestru Lungoci (Bukovina), Mihai Lăcătuș (Bukovina), Ion Lăceanu (Muntenia), and Ion Fărcaș (Transylvania); in the Republic of Moldova – Alexei Botoșanu, Teodor Captari, Liubomir Iorga, Leonid Moșanu, and Petre Zaharia. Their repertoire and performance style generally differed from the archaic pastoral style, but it was these musicians who contributed to the popularization of the fluier as a symbol of the Romanian musical tradition.

=== Ensembles of fluier players ===
In the second half of the 20th century, a new phenomenon uncharacteristic of folk tradition appeared in Romania – ensembles of fluier players (Romanian: formațiile de fluierași). Their creation was largely driven by the ideological and propagandistic tasks associated with the state policy of supporting amateur arts.

Since folk culture had no practice of ensemble playing on wind instruments of the same type, the new collectives borrowed principles of choral arrangement. Their performance manner employed unison, canon, distribution of parts by octaves, and techniques based on drone sounds.

The first such ensembles appeared in shepherd communities, which had more bearers of the instrumental tradition; later, the model was adopted by agricultural regions. Despite a mixed reception, over time, the ensembles of fluier players gained the attention of the public and specialists. Eventually, other instruments and small vocal groups began to be added to them, leading to the development of more complex forms – even to experiments in the spirit of "symphonism" for folk wind instruments.

== See also ==
- Romanian traditional music
- Bucium
- Nai
- Ocarina

== Sources ==
- Burada, Teodor T. (1876). "Despre întrebuinţarea musicei în unele obiceiuri ale poporului român" [On the use of music in some customs of the Romanian people]. Almanahu Musicalu (in Romanian). Anul II. Iași: 51–79.
- Burada, Teodor T. (1877). "Cercetări asupra danţurilor şi instrumentelor de musică ale românilor" [Research on Romanian dances and musical instruments]. Almanah Musicalu (in Romanian). Anul III. Iași: 76.
- Cantemiru, Demetrie (1883). Istoria ieroglifică [Hieroglyphic story]. Operele (in Romanian). Vol. VI. Bucurescĭ: Academia Româna.
- Burada, Teodor T. (1891). "Cercetărĭ asupra musicei ostașesti la romăni" [Research on Romanian military music]. Revista pentru istorie, archeologie și filologie (in Romanian). București: Tipografia Curții Regale, F. Göbl Fii: 49–71.
- Xenophon (1922). Anabasis. Books IV-VII. Translated by Brownson, Carleton Lewis. London: William Heinemann.
- Strabo (1928). The geography. Vol. V. Translated by Jones, Horace Leonard. London: William Heinemann.
- Posluşnicu, Mihail Gr. (1928). Istoria musicei la români. De la Renaștere până'n epoca de consolidare a culturii artistice [History of Romanian music. From the Renaissance to the era of the consolidation of artistic culture] (in Romanian). București: Cartea românească.
- Alexandru, Tiberiu (1956). Instrumentele muzicale ale poporului romîn [The musical instruments of the Romanian people] (in Romanian). București: Editura de stat pentru literatură şi artă.
- Черныш, А. П. (1959). "Поздний палеолит Среднего Приднестровья" [The upper Paleolithic of the Middle Dniester region]. Палеолит Среднего Приднестровья (in Russian). XV. Москва: Издательство АН СССР: 5–214.
- Bartók, Béla (1975). Suchoff, Benjamin (ed.). Rumanian Folk Music. Vol. 5. Maramureș County. The Hague: Martinus Nijhoff. doi:10.1007/978-94-010-1686-5. ISBN 978-94-010-1688-9.
- Alexandru, Tiberiu (1975). Muzica populară românească [Romanian Folk Music] (in Romanian). București: Editura Muzicală.
- Alexandru, Tiberiu (1980a). Folcloristică. Organologie. Muzicologie. Studii [Folklore. Organology. Musicology. Studies] (in Romanian). Vol. 2. București: Editura Muzicală.
- Alexandru, Tiberiu (1978). Folcloristică. Organologie. Muzicologie. Studii [Folklore. Organology. Musicology. Studies] (in Romanian). Vol. 1. București: Editura Muzicală.
- Lăcătuş, Mihai (1981). Herţea, Iosif (ed.). Şuieră iarba, cântă lemnul [The grass hisses, the wood sings] (in Romanian). București: Consiliul Culturii și Educației Socialiste.
- Alexandru, Tiberiu (1994). "Tiberiu Alexandru la 80 de ani: Curriculum vitae" [Tiberiu Alexandru at 80: Curriculum vitae]. Anuarul Institutului de etnografie şi folclor "Constantin Brăiloiu", seria nouă (in Romanian). 5. Bucureşti: 199–186.
- Lupaşcu, Marian (1994). "Marin Chisăr – dinamica unei personalităţi folclorice" [Marin Chisăr – The dynamics of a folkloric personality]. Anuarul Institutului de etnografie şi folclor "Constantin Brăiloiu", seria nouă (in Romanian). 5. Bucureşti: 173–186.
- Sadie, Stanley; Tyrrell, John, eds. (2001). The New Grove Dictionary of Music and Musicians. Vol. 21 (2 ed.). New York: Macmillan Publishers Limited. ISBN 978-0-19-517067-2.
- Ciuculescu, Traian (2001). Fluierul la români [The Romanian fluier] (in Romanian). Pitești: Editura Paralela 45. p. 260. ISBN 973-593-419-1.
- Sala, Marius, ed. (2002). Micul dicționar academic [The small academic dictionary] (in Romanian). Vol. 2. București: Editura univers enciclopedic.
- Chiseliță, Vasile (2002). Muzica instrumentală din nordul Bucovinei. Repertoriul de fluier [Instrumental music from northern Bukovina. The fluier repertoire] (in Romanian). Chișinău: Știința. ISBN 9975-67-256-6.
- Șarban, Ion, ed. (2009). Arta muzicală a Moldovei. Istorie și modernitate [The musical art of Moldova. History and modernity] (in Romanian). Chișinău: Grafema Libris. ISBN 978-9975-52-046-1.
- Chiseliță, Vasile (2009a). "Fenomenul lăutăriei și tradiția instrumentală" [The phenomenon of lautari and the instrumental tradition]. Arta muzicală a Moldovei. Istorie și modernitate (in Romanian). Chișinău: Grafema Libris: 73–99. ISBN 978-9975-52-046-1.
- Chiseliță, Vasile (2009b). "Repertoriul muzical păstoresc" [Pastoral musical repertoire]. Arta muzicală a Moldovei. Istorie și modernitate (in Romanian). Chişinău: Grafema Libris: 235–272. ISBN 978-9975-52-046-1.
- Babii, Vladimir (2012). Studiu de organologie [Organology study] (in Romanian) (2nd ed.). Chișinău: Elena V.I. ISBN 978-9975-4346-5-2.
- Libin, Laurence, ed. (2014b). The Grove Dictionary of Musical Instruments. Vol. 2 (Daadua – Hymn Technology Ltd) (2 ed.). New York: Oxford University Press. ISBN 978-0-19-935030-8.
- Libin, Laurence, ed. (2014e). The Grove Dictionary of Musical Instruments. Vol. 5 (Tibia – Zygmuntowicz, Samuel) (2 ed.). New York: Oxford University Press. ISBN 978-0-19-935034-6.
- Guta, Armand (2015). "From Ius Valachicum to the Vlach folkloric influences within Central Europe". Balcanica Posnaniensia. Acta et studia. 22 (1): 71–81. doi:10.14746/bp.2015.22.6.
- Ciuculescu, Traian (2018). Cavalul românesc [The Romanian caval] (in Romanian). Golești – Vâlcea: Fântâna lui Manole. ISBN 9786068641126.
- Papană, Ovidiu (2019). Instrumente tradiționale românești. Studii acustico-muzicale [Traditional Romanian Instruments. Acoustic-musical studies] (in Romanian). Vol. 2. București: Editura Etnologică.

== External sources ==
- Cazacu, Ilie (1936). "Arcanul, Corabeasca, Ursareasca". Fonds Constantin Brailoiu (in Romanian). Archived from the original on 2025-07-21.
- Chiseliță, Vasile (2011). "Când şi-a pierdut ciobanul oile" [When the shepherd lost his sheep]. Patrimoniul cultural imaterial al Republicii Moldova (in Romanian). Ministerul Culturii al Republicii Moldova. Archived from the original on 2024-11-04.
- Brăiloiu, Constantin; Rădulescu, Speranţa; Aubert, Laurent (1988). "ROUMANIE. Musique de villages. 1. Olténie: Runc et les villages du Gorj. 2. Moldavie: Fundu Moldovei et la Bucovine. 3. Transylvanie: Drăguş et le Pays de l'Olt (3 CD AIMP IX-XI/VDE 487-489)". vdegallo.com (in French). VDE-GALLO.
- "Fluiera". dexonline.ro (in Romanian). 2025. Archived from the original on 2025-07-28.
- hora-instruments.com (2025). "Hora Instruments". Archived from the original on 2025-09-08.
- fabricadecaval.ro (2025). "Fabrica de caval" [The Caval Factory] (in Romanian). Archived from the original on 2025-02-28.
