= Moldavian fluier =

Open, end-blown shepherd's flute of northern Moldavia and Bukovina

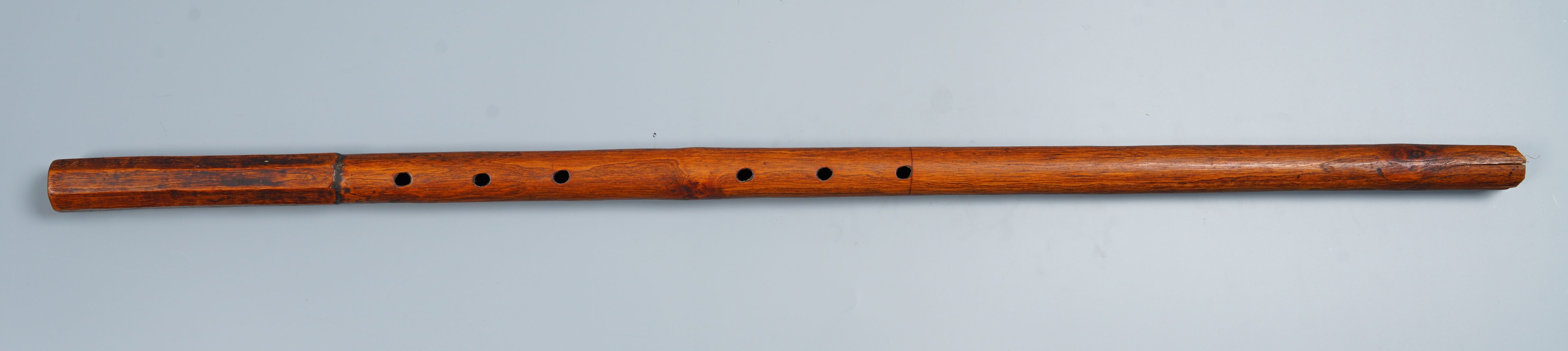
- Fluier mare, early XX century

Woodwind instrument
- Classification: Aerophone
- Hornbostel–Sachs classification: 421.111.12 (An end-blown flute without a whistle, with an open end)

Playing range
- two octaves (variable)

Related instruments
- Fluier (family), tilinca, frilka, floyara, frula, kaval, bucium

The Moldavian fluier (Romanian: fluier moldovenesc, also: fluier fără dop, literally "fluier without a stopper") is a traditional shepherd's wind instrument used in Romanian traditional music, a type of semi-transverse open flute. It is widespread in the north of the historical region of Moldavia, as well as partially in the north of Transylvania.

The instrument is a cylindrical tube with open ends, lacking a fipple (whistle mouthpiece), with a semi-transverse embouchure. It is predominantly made of wood, sometimes metal, and has six finger holes. A distinction is made between small (25–35 cm), medium (35–45 cm), and large (over 50 cm, usually 80–90 cm) fluiers; the small and large models are the most popular. In contrast to the more common fipple flutes, the Moldavian fluier requires the performer to form the air stream with their lips, directing it onto the edge of the hole – which allows for a rich timbral spectrum, fine dynamics, and expressiveness. The sound of the Moldavian fluier is typically softer, warmer, and richer in overtones, whereas fipple fluiers produce a bright, stable, but less flexible sound. Traditional performance is often accompanied by a guttural background sound (Romanian: ison gutural; ison gâjâit; gemut) – an archaic sound production method that creates a characteristic deep, resonant effect.

The fluier played an important role in traditional shepherd society – not only as a musical instrument but also as a means of ritual and interpersonal communication. Its sound accompanied rites related to protecting the flock, initiation, courtship, and was also used as a signaling device and accompaniment for dances, festivals, and funerals. The melodies performed on the fluier covered the entire spectrum of functions – from magico-ritual to entertainment – and reflected the main spheres of life in the rural community.

== Research, transcriptions, and recordings ==
External videos
- Moldavian fluier
- Trifanuca Nemciuc — Doina fluier mare, Bucovina, 1932
- Leontina Niga, Trifanuca Nemciuc — Bocet fluier mare, Bucovina, 1932
- Ilie Cazacu — Când şi-a pierdut ciobanul oile fluier, Bucovina, 1936
- Mihai Ursu — Când sue viţele la munte fluier mare, Bucovina, 1938
- Ilie Cazacu — Jocul caprelor fluier, Bucovina, 1954
- Grigore Nistor — Doina fluier mare, Bucovina, 1969
- Silvestru Lungoci — Bătrânească fluier mare, Bucovina, 1974
- Constantin Sofian — Bătrânească din Frătăuți fluier mare, Bucovina, 1974
- Silvestru Lungoci — De jale fluier mare, Bucovina, 1978
- Ion Petreuș — Hora lungă ciobănească fluier lung, Maramureş, 1976
- Virgil Cenuşă — Doină și Arcanul fluier mare, Bucovina, 2014
- Vasile A. Apătroaiei — Ciobăneasca fluier mic, Moldova
- Gheorghe Tisăliță — În zori de zi și Joc bărbătesc fluier lung, Maramureş
- Horaţiu Neagoe — Când şi-a pierdut ciobanul oile fluier, Maramureş
- Trei parale — Doină și Bătrâneasca fluier mare, Bucovina, 2022

The first transcriptions of traditional Bukovinian fluier melodies, collected in the distribution area of the Moldavian fluier, were made by the folklorist Alexandru Voevidca between 1907 and 1909.

In 1913, in Maramureș (northern Transylvania), Hungarian composer and folklorist Béla Bartók described open fluiers with a notch and six finger holes. He distinguished two types of these instruments: the Romanian: trișcă (a short fluier, 30–40 cm long ) and the fluier lung (two or more times longer, literally "long fluier"). Among the melodies he recorded were the song of the "lost sheep," the hore lungă (here hore is a regional name for the lyric song, the doina), as well as dance melodies. Bartók made recordings and musical transcriptions of the melodies.

The ethnomusicologist Constantin Brăiloiu documented the use of fipple-less fluiers during his fieldwork in Bukovina in the 1930s.

The leading Romanian organologist of traditional instruments, Tiberiu Alexandru, devoted a section to the Moldavian fluier in his classic monograph Musical Instruments of the Romanian People (1956).

The monograph by Moldovan researcher Vasile Chiselița, Instrumental Music of Northern Bukovina. Repertoire for the Fluier (2002), is based on materials from ethnographic expeditions from 1982–1990. It examines in detail the organological, genre, melodic, and other aspects of the fluier tradition of the Romanian population of northern Bukovina (now Chernivtsi Oblast, Ukraine). The publication contains a large number of musical transcriptions.

In 2010, musicologist Constanța Cristescu published a catalog of traditional musical recordings made in the second half of the 20th century in Romanian Bukovina, which include performance samples on large and small open fluiers.

The monograph The Archaic Musical Style of the Rădăuți County (2013), prepared by researchers Florin Bucescu and Viorel Bîrleanu from Iași, contains descriptions and transcriptions of the archaic layer of Bukovina's musical tradition. The authors denote this style with the term bătrâneasca (from Romanian – "old-style"). The publication is accompanied by an audio disc with the authors' field recordings from the 1960s–1970s, including melodies performed on the Moldavian fluier.

In 2018, ethnomusicologist Ovidiu Papană published the study "Semi-Transverse Fluiers from Moldova," dedicated to the organological features of the tilinca and the Moldavian fluier.

== Typology and construction of fluiers ==
The fluier is an autochthonous Romanian wind instrument, represented in 17 varieties, differing in construction: single and double, end-blown (longitudinal), transverse, and semi-transverse, open or with a fipple, with a varying number of finger holes or none at all. The name presumably derives from the verb Latin: flare ( "to blow").

Like folk songs, traditional musical instruments vary from one region of the country to another, their development occurring under specific historical and cultural conditions. For instance, the fipple flute with six finger holes is more common in the south of Romania–in Oltenia, Muntenia, Dobruja, and southern Moldavia. Its elongated version with five holes in Oltenia is called a caval (Oltenian or Romanian caval). Folk transverse flutes are also found in a small part of Oltenia.

In Dobruja, an open fluier with six finger holes on the front and an additional hole on the back is common. The larger Bulgarian caval is also used – an open, semi-transverse flute consisting of three sections, with seven finger holes on the front, one additional hole on the back, and four resonator holes in the lower part of the instrument.

In the northern regions of Romania – especially in the north of the historical Moldavia region, in Bukovina (including its Ukrainian part) – open fluiers without a fipple are common. These include the tilincă – a simple semi-transverse flute without finger holes, about 80 cm long – as well as semi-transverse fluiers with six finger holes. Tiberiu Alexandru classified such fluiers as "Moldavian".

The fipple-less fluier is considered a more archaic form compared to the fipple fluier. Some researchers view the Moldavian fluier as a transitional form between the tilincă and the more common fipple fluiers. Alexandru quotes a folk master and performer from Bukovina, Mihai Lăcătuș: "The true grandfather is the tilincă, the father is the fluier [without a fipple], and the child is the trișcă [here – a double pipe fipple fluier]" (Romanian: adevăratu moş e telinca, tata e fluieru (fără dop) şi copilu e trişca).

== The Moldavian fluier: area and local names ==
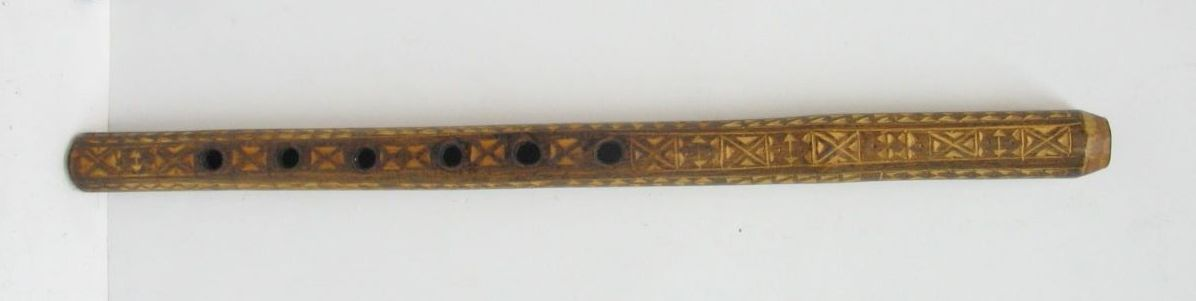
Fluier mic, master Mihai Lăcătuș (1924, elderwood, 31.5 cm)

The fipple-less fluier with six finger holes is characteristic of the northern part of historical Moldavia. It is found in Suceava, Bacău, and Iași counties, among the Romanian population of Ukrainian Bukovina, and in the Transylvanian territories adjacent to Romanian Bukovina – in the Năsăud, Bistrița, and Toplița areas, where it spread from the Vatra Dornei region.

The Bukovina area is considered by researchers to be a zone of early formation of the Romanian folkloric tradition. The region's specific geographical and historical conditions contributed to the preservation of archaic forms of folk culture, which is also reflected in its musical tradition. Pastoralism – one of the main economic activities of the Vlachs in the foothill regions – played an important role in this. Therefore, it is in the Bukovinian area that rudiments and even entire strata of the most ancient forms of musical creativity are recorded.

In the north and northwest of Romanian Bukovina, the small fluier is called fluieraș, and the large instrument is called fluier mare. The word "fluieraș" is also used to mean a fluier player.

In central Moldavia, the small instrument may be called trișcă, and the large one caval, by analogy with the Oltenian caval.

In the distribution area of the Moldavian fluier, the fipple fluier is also known, which in the northern regions is also called trișcă. Alexandru noted that the existence of two or more names for the same instrument, as well as the same term designating different instruments, is a common phenomenon in the world of Romanian folk instruments.

Vasile Chiselița, studying fluiers in northern Bukovina (Ukraine), also pointed to the heterogeneity of folk terminology. Although the general term "fluier" is most often used, special names reflecting the instrument's structural features also exist. Moldavian fluiers of increased length (50–80 cm and more) are called long fluiers or large fluiers (Romanian: fluier lung; fluier mare). For instruments 25–35 cm long without a fipple, the term "small fluier" (fluier mic) is used, and for instruments with a fipple – fluieraș. The term "caval" is not found in the Northern Bukovinian tradition. The double fluier is called trișcă (Note: More usual name for it is Romanian: fluier gemănat.) in some places and consists of two wooden tubular bodies: one with six finger holes, the other without.

Similar open folk flutes with six finger holes are found in the Carpathian region among the Hutsuls: the frilka (30–40 cm long) and the floyara (about 60 cm). These parallels reflect the common structure of Carpathian shepherd culture, formed during inter-ethnic contacts, including in connection with the migration of the Romanian (Vlach) population in the XIII–XIV centuries. Medieval chronicles note the spread of shepherd settlements organized under "Vlach law" (Latin: jus valachicum) among the Slavic peoples of Central Europe – in Galicia, Slovakia, the Polish Podhale, and Moravian Wallachia. The name of the shepherd's flute – fluier – became widespread in various forms among other peoples of the Carpathians: Hungarian: furulya, fujara (Slovak), and fujarka (Podhale region, Poland).

== Construction ==
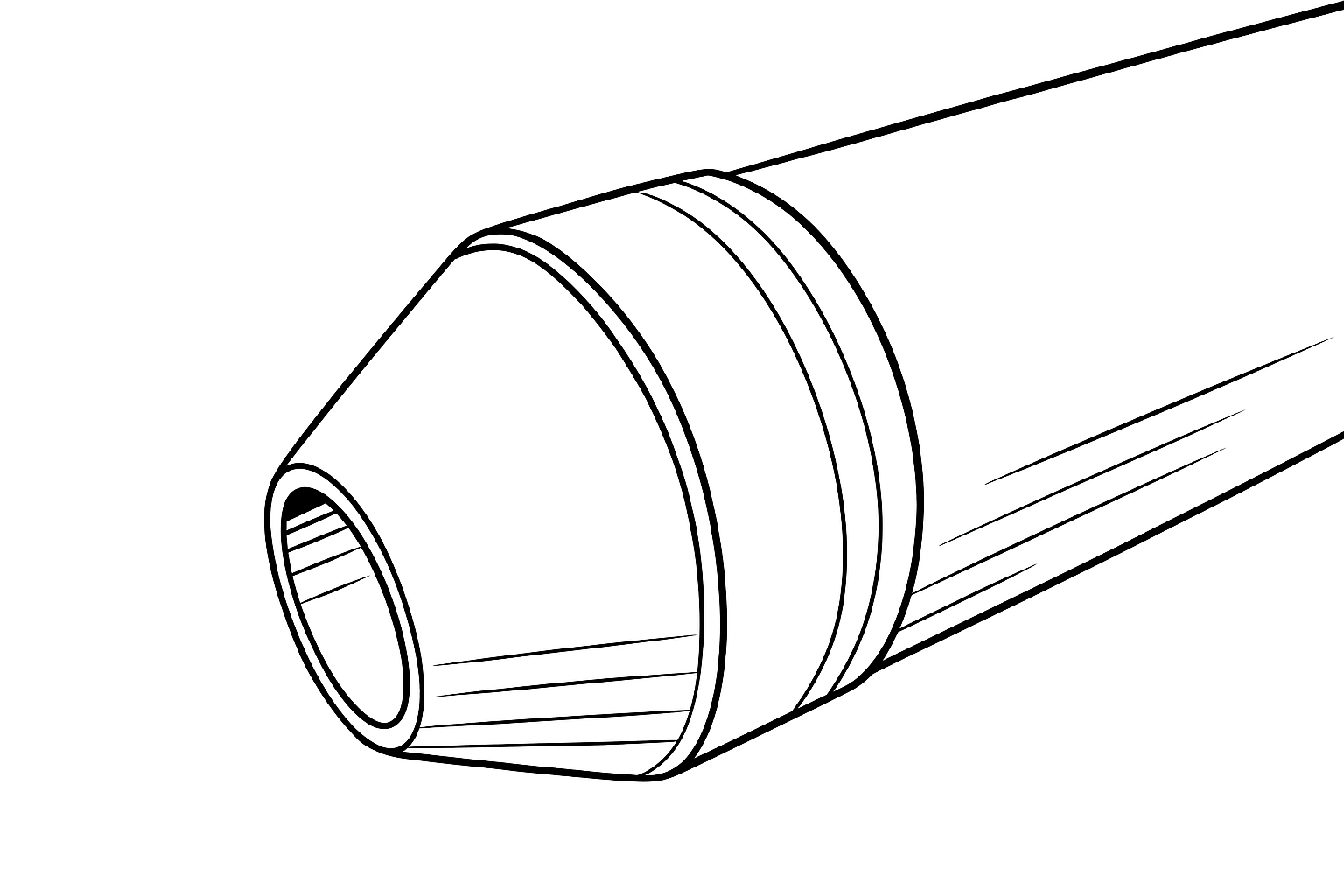
The blowing end of the Moldavian fluier

Moldavian fluiers are semi-transverse flutes without a fipple – tubes open at both ends. They have bevelled rim (Romanian: rost), which facilitates sound production. Wooden fluiers have a slightly conical shape; metal ones are cylindrical.

In size, they are distinguished as small (25–35 cm), medium (35–45 cm), (Note: Tiberiu Alexandru notes that the medium size is found less often (Alexandru 1956, p. 56.)) and large fluiers (50–80 cm and more). An instance 105 cm long is known, which belonged to a tall shepherd.

The instrument has six finger holes on the front, cut in a straight line. On large fluiers, they are grouped in threes; on small ones, they are evenly spaced. The holes are more often elliptical (oriented along the axis), less often round. The distance from the lower end of the tube to the first hole is noticeably greater than the intervals between the others, and the sixth hole is located approximately in the middle of the tube.

Sizes and proportions vary from one instrument to another, which is related to differences in the measurement methods used by folk masters.

For the manufacture of wooden fluiers, local hardwoods are used: for long ones – maple, hazel, less often ash; and for small and medium ones – plum, cherry, elder. Since the 20th century, metal fluiers – made of brass, copper, or aluminum – have also been produced. Wooden fluiers sound softer, warmer, and hold their tuning better in temperature changes, but are more fragile. Metal ones are louder, with a sharper timbre.

=== Traditional manufacturing technology ===
All types of Moldavian fluiers are made either by the performers themselves or by village craftsmen. Many musicians prefer to make their instruments themselves, fitting them to the length of their arm and achieving the desired sound. The instrument's construction is relatively simple, and the measurement methods are empirical (using fingers, string, wood chips, etc.). Therefore, the tuning of the fluiers is generally non-tempered and varies from one instrument to another. Only a few masters achieve standardization in accordance with a tuning fork.

Mihai Lăcătuș from Câmpulung Moldovenesc (Bukovina) described the traditional process of making Moldavian fluiers in detail. It begins with selecting fresh wood: maple, cherry, hazel, beech, elm, rowan, pear, sweet cherry, or elder. The wood is harvested in winter. A fresh branch is tightly wrapped with a cord and a hole is drilled through it. After this, the cord is removed, the bark is stripped, the wood is treated with mineral oil, and then smoked in a chimney for 5–6 days. If desired, the branch can be wrapped with cord again before smoking – the smoke will then leave a decorative pattern. After this, the wood can be stored for years, remaining suitable for instrument making.

Before final processing, the blank is trimmed and sanded. The end that is blown into is always chosen from the thick side, where the tree's annual rings overlap like tiles. This facilitates moisture drainage.

The holes are marked in a straight line, using a measuring stick (Romanian: pasnic), and then drilled, after first piercing the wood with a sharp nail. The holes are cleaned (reamed) with a hot iron. It is taken into account that the wood shrinks as it dries: for example, a hole drilled with a 12 mm bit may shrink to 11 mm.

In northern Bukovina, a unique "tempering" hardening method was sometimes used: to increase the density of the walls of large fluiers made from softwoods, they were boiled several times in sweet sheep's cheese – urda.

== Acoustics and tuning ==
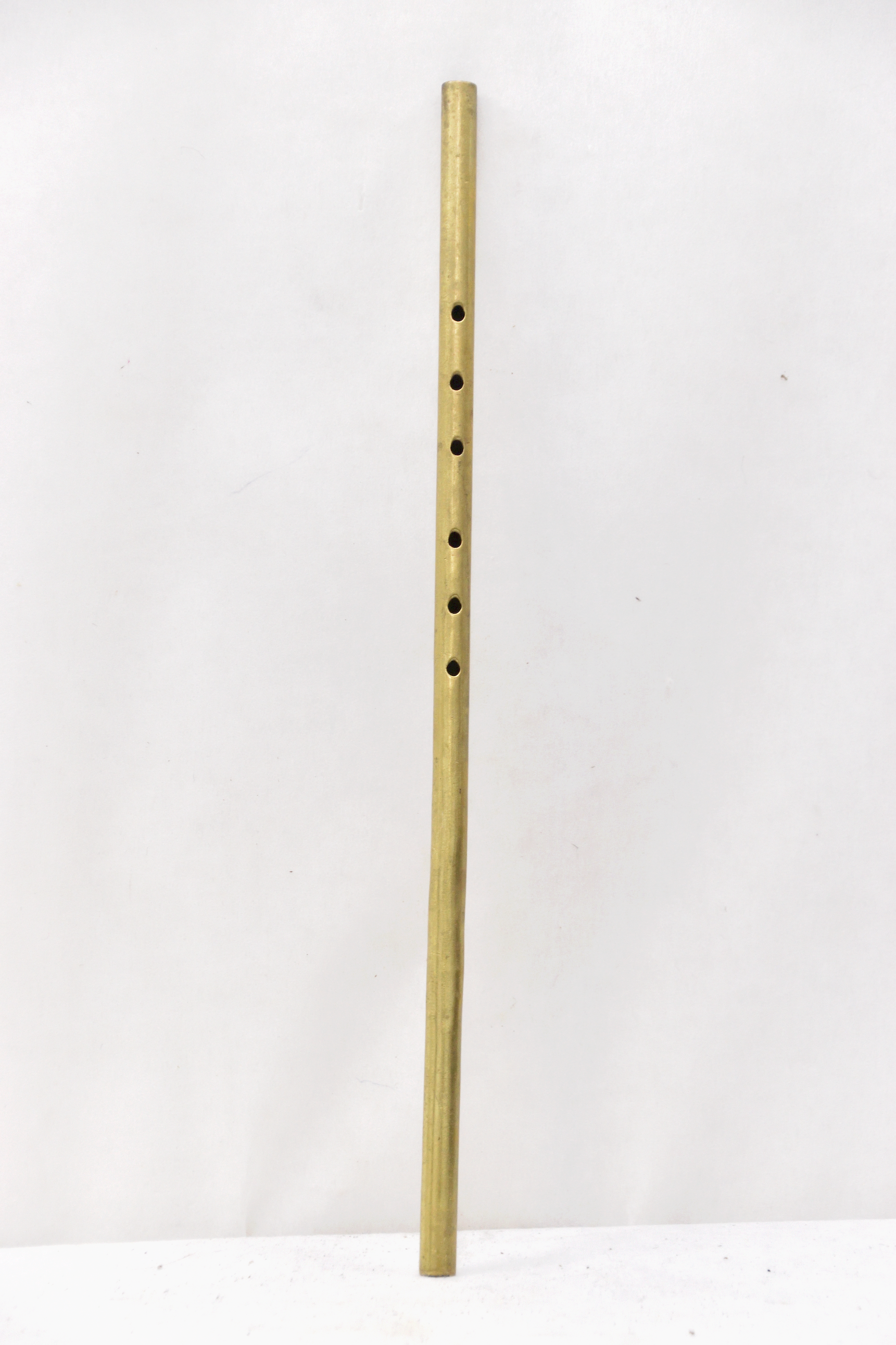
Fluier mare, copper (Suceava, Bukovina, first quarter of the XX century)

The Moldavian fluier sounds when an air stream is directed onto the sharp edge of the tube. The pitch is changed by opening and closing the finger holes, which affects the length of the sounding air column. When all holes are closed, the fundamental tone sounds. Sequentially opening the holes forms a diatonic scale. By increasing the airflow (overblowing), it is possible to transition into the second and partially the third octave.

Additional notes are produced using the technique of half-covering the holes, as well as by using alternative "fork" fingering (non-standard combinations of partially open and closed holes). The pitch can also be varied by changing the instrument's angle and the angle of blowing.

The range covers approximately two octaves. Folk performers usually speak of two registers, calling playing in the low register – Romanian: pe gros, and in the high register – pe subțire. Alexandru distinguishes three registers: the first includes the first fifth of the first octave and is characterized by a weak, whistling, and slightly hoarse sound; the first two or three notes in it are very quiet and difficult to intone; the second covers the rest of the first octave and the entire second octave, its sound becoming progressively brighter and more penetrating; the third consists of a few notes in the third octave (approximately a fourth), which sound shrill and become increasingly difficult to produce as the pitch rises. Due to the difficulty of playing the very low and very high notes, as well as their imprecise or harsh timbre, musicians rarely use them.

The tuning is diatonic but can vary depending on the master and region. The pitch of the notes and the interval relationships are unstable, as the instruments are made by hand without precise measuring tools. The long tube gives the sound a softness and a slight "breathiness," especially noticeable in wooden fluiers.

In 1950–1951, Mihai Lăcătuș constructed a set of three Moldavian fluiers, intended for simultaneous performance by three players, to produce a three-part harmony. It included:

- a large fluier (length 54.3 cm, inner diameter 1.5 cm) with a diatonic major tuning from D4 and a slightly sharp third;
- a medium fluier (31.5 cm, 1.3 cm) with a diatonic major tuning from A4 and a slightly flat third;
- a small fluier (27 cm, 1 cm) with a tempered tuning from D5.

Through experimentation, he achieved tuning agreement among the three instruments according to an acoustic principle, where the ratios of their fundamental tones approximate the harmonic intervals of a fifth and an octave – similar to how it was done for fluiers made for playing in professional ensembles.

== Playing technique ==
The sound on the fluier is produced with pursed lips. The instrument is held at an angle (semi-transversely), and the air is directed onto the sharp edge of the tube. The sound is formed without a fipple, by splitting the air stream – a kind of "improvised whistle".

Changing the instrument's angle and the angle of blowing allows the pitch to be varied up to a semitone, which makes it possible to produce quarter-tones and flexibly adjust the intonation. Half-covering the holes is used to obtain intermediate notes.

Despite having six holes, in practice, only the top three are often used, while the others are used mainly in cadences. When playing the small fluier, the sound production is accompanied by a light whistle, forming a characteristic timbre. The large fluiers, thanks to the special arrangement of their holes, allow for playing in two modal scales – Lydian and Mixolydian.

A characteristic feature of traditional performance is the guttural sound (drone), created by the vocal cords. It gives the melody expressiveness and is especially often used in doinas and funeral songs. A musician who plays in this manner is said to "play in the shepherd's style".

In experienced performers who use the guttural hum, the lower supporting tone sounds continuously, is stable, and fixed in pitch. This creates a two-part texture (biphony): the lower tone functions as a support and mostly drones. The musician becomes a kind of extension of his instrument, and his voice acquires an instrumental function. In folk aesthetics, mastery of this technique is perceived as a sign of a refined and sophisticated manner. At the same time, Constanța Cristescu noted the negative reaction of professional musicians – even laughter in the audience – to performances by folk artists using this archaic playing style. (Note: It is known that conductors struggled with "unaesthetic" elements in the music of folk musicians who joined professional orchestras—asymmetrical rhythms and guttural sounds from the fluiers and cavals. See, for example, the note for Marin Chiser's 1941 melody in the booklet of the disc from the Institute of Ethnography and Folklore.(IEF))

According to Vasile Chiselița, the playing traditions of the large Moldavian fluier influenced not only the performance style but also the development of the region's instrumental makeup. The droning principle, characteristic of the fluier, was later "materialized" in the construction of other folk instruments, such as the cimpoi (Romanian bagpipe) and the trișcă (here – a double fipple flute). To produce stable supporting notes, they are equipped with special droning pipes. In the playing of old violinists, the use of an open string as a drone is also noted, which distinctively imitates the guttural hum of the large fluier.

Performance on the large fluier is predominantly solo. Ensemble playing is found only in funeral laments, when two to four fluier players may perform simultaneously. In such cases, instruments with the same tuning are selected. Joint performance with instruments of other types is not practiced in traditional shepherd music. (Note: The use of the Moldovan fluier in ensemble lineups, however, has been documented in professional lăutari tarafs. (Chiseliță 2009, p. 90)) When accompanying songs, colinde (carols), or laments, fluier players usually duplicate the melody in unison or at the octave, which introduces elements of heterophony.

Despite fipple flutes being much easier to learn, in northern Moldavia, the preference for open Moldavian fluiers is traditionally maintained. They are valued for their powerful sound and wide expressiveness, as well as for the ability to flexibly vary pitch and timbre, which makes the instrument particularly significant in the local performance tradition.

== Learning ==
Mastery of the fluier, cultivation of a taste for fluier music, and assimilation of the corresponding repertoire are traditionally transmitted from father to son, predominantly in shepherd families. Playing the fluier, like shepherding itself, is considered an exclusively male occupation, with rare exceptions.

The process of learning the different types of fluiers is distributed by age category and depends on the sound production features. The fipple fluier requires less effort, so it is suitable for beginners – children aged 5 to 8. In the peasant environment, such a fluier is considered a toy that children amuse themselves with ("whistling into the fluier").

Small and medium fipple-less fluiers are learned by adolescents aged 10–14: sound production on these instruments requires a special embouchure and considerable physical effort.

Mastery of the large fluier begins only at an older age – from 16–18, coinciding with the completion of the voice's mutation (breaking) and its stabilization. It is only then that it becomes possible to produce the guttural sound characteristic of traditional performance.

== Functions and use in tradition ==
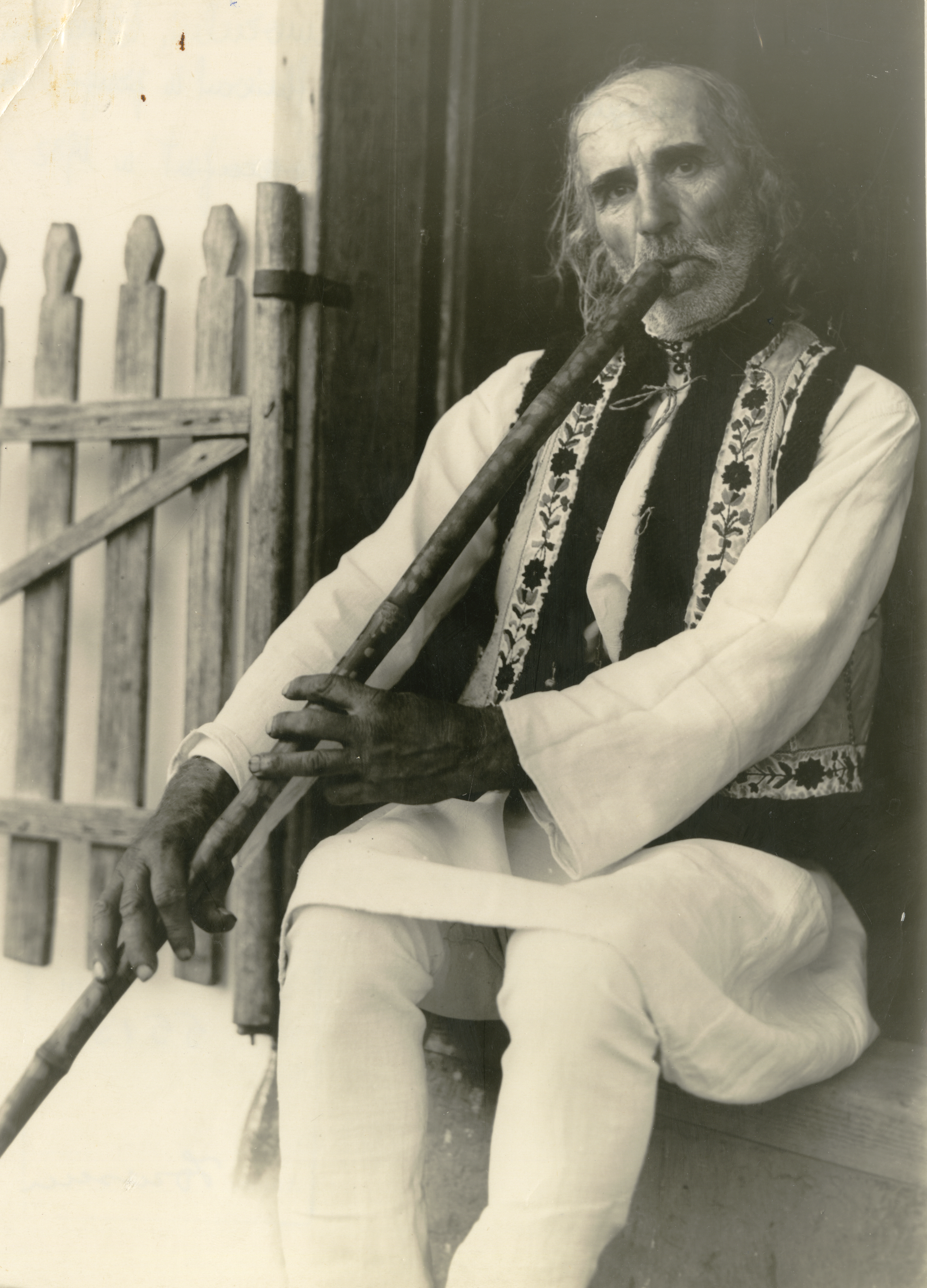
Performer on a fluier mare at a funeral (Humoreni, Bukovina, 1932)

The fluier occupies a special place in folk culture, and fluier players (fluierași) are traditionally respected in the community. This attitude is linked to sacral beliefs about the instrument's origin. A folk proverb says: "God made the fluier and the sheep, while the devil made the cimpoi and the goat" (Romanian: Dumnezeu a făcut fluierul şi oaia, în timp ce diavolul a făcut cimpoiul şi capra). It is believed that the sound of the fluier is endowed with magical properties and is "blessed by God," so it is not subject to religious prohibitions: one can play the fluier even during Lent. Fluier music is considered more "natural" in the popular consciousness and is contrasted with other musical traditions, primarily the lăutărească music.

The instrument is used in various spheres of traditional life: in shepherd practices, in ritual and calendar ceremonies, in dance music, and in lyric pieces for listening. This distribution of functions reflects both the utilitarian and symbolic roles of the fluier in folk culture.

=== The fluier in shepherd life ===
The main area of the fluier's use is related to shepherd life. The tradition distinguishes two main genres: road signal-tunes (Romanian: cântări de drum) (Note: In other regions of Romania, these melodies are called șireaguri.) and pasture melodies (cântări de plai, literally "plai tunes" (Note: Plai is a Romanian word that denotes sloping mountain or hill slopes, usually covered with pastures (cf. the Hutsul polonyna). In a broader sense, it means land or area; for example, plai natal translates to "homeland." (dexonline (b)))). Both genres are closely linked to the functions of managing the flock and to shepherd beliefs.

Cântări de drum are signal melodies played by shepherds on the move for orientation and flock management. Such tunes guide the sheep to the pasture, helping to keep them in the flock, especially in the dark. The shepherd, playing the fluier, walks ahead, and the flock follows him. Although these melodies trace back to bucium signals, the cântări de drum melodies are distinguished by a more developed structure and lyrical character, owing to the technical capabilities of the fluier.

Cântări de plai are tunes played on the pastures (on the plai), predominantly in the morning, at sunrise. They are associated with magical and protective functions – a sonic appeal to the deity of light, symbolizing life, abundance, and fertility. Although their original meaning is forgotten, performers emphasize the antiquity of this tradition: "it has been so since the ancestors." The sun motif indicates a possible connection to pre-Christian, particularly Dacian, cults.

The fluier occupies a central place in the shepherd's system of acoustic orientation. Along with other sound-producing devices – the cowbell (talancă; talangă), the bell (clopoțelul), the jingle bell (zurgălăul), the whip, and the bucium – it ensures the management and protection of the flock.

On high-altitude pastures, shepherds play both for their own pleasure and based on the belief that the sound of the fluier promotes better grazing and abundant milk yields. There is also a belief that fluier music possesses a protective power, warding off wild animals and evil spirits (zâne).

Large fluiers (80–90 cm long) were traditionally used by the baci (head shepherds), who did not accompany the flock but remained at the stână (a summer shepherd camp outside the village, usually in the mountains).

The instrumental version of the musical poem "When the Shepherd Lost His Sheep" is performed on the fluier, as well as doinas – Doina ciobanului, Doina oilor, Doina dimineții, Jelea huțanului, Zicala, Doina de pe coastă, De jele.

=== The fluier as a means of communication ===
A small set of melodies existed that performed a signal function and served as a means of communication among unmarried youth. This repertoire includes, for example, the melodies "When I went to the girls" (Când mergeam la fete) and "When I returned from the girls" (Când veneam de la fete). In the recent past, this practice also had an initiatic character.

=== Ritual use ===
The fluier was used in various ritual ceremonies:

- Funeral – instrumental laments and accompaniment for vocal wailing (Bocet, De mort, La mort, De bocit, De jele);
- Wedding – the bride's laments, songs about the dowry (Cântecul miresei, La zestre, Cântecul nevestelor);
- Calendar – Christmas colinde (carols), theatrical winter rituals with masks, such as the Goat Dance (Capra), and the Bear Dance (Jocul ursului, La urătură).

=== Dance accompaniment ===
A significant part of the fluier's repertoire consists of dance melodies. Dances common in the region include: Hora, Bătuta, Corăghiasca, Arcanul, Bătrâneasca, Huțulca, Ruseasca, Cozacul, Ardeleanca, and others.

Unlike in other regions, the fluier in Bukovina is an integral part of the traditional lăutari tarafs (folk bands), which accompanied village dances (Romanian: hora). (Note: In Bukovina and a number of other regions (Banat, Maramureș, and Transylvania), Romanian musicians traditionally had a significant role in lăutari bands, whereas in other regions, these bands were predominantly Roma. (Chiseliță 2009, p. 79)) For example, the taraf of Sidor Androniciescu, recorded in the 1930s by Constantin Brăiloiu, included a violin, fluier, cobza, and double bass.

=== Music for listening ===
Unlike signal or ritual tunes, its main purpose is not to accompany an action, but rather focused listening and the conveyance of deep emotions. Such pieces are typically performed solo and have a deeply personal, improvisational character:

- The musical poem "When the Shepherd Lost His Sheep" (Când și-a pierdut ciobanul oile);
- Instrumental ballads (Doina plăieșilor lui Ștefan cel Mare, Jelea haiducului, Doina Carpaților);
- Doinas, also called cântec de jele in Bukovina (Doina bătrânilor, Doina de jele, Jelea huțanului);
- Lyric songs (Cântecul Volocii, Foaie verde de pelin, Cântec, Crești, pădure, și te-ndeasă, Bătrânească).

== Known performers ==
- Ilie Cazacu (or Cazac; 1903–1979) – a fluier player, member of the taraf of violinist Sidor Androniciescu. In 1928, in the village of Fundu Moldovei, his playing was recorded by Constantin Brăiloiu's folklore expedition. Among Cazacu's famous pieces is the Bukovinian version of the musical poem "When the Shepherd Lost His Sheep". The Electrecord record studio released a vinyl disc of his recordings.
- Mihai Lăcătuș (1906–1983) – a musician and master of folk wind instruments from the town of Câmpulung Moldovenesc. He began playing the fluier at the age of six while herding the family sheep. In 1948, he created a folklore ensemble and also performed as a soloist. In 1981, Lăcătuș published the book Şuieră iarba, cântă lemnul ("The Grass Whistles, the Wood Sings"), in which he described his life, traditional playing techniques on the folk wind instruments of Bukovina – the tilincă, the Moldavian fluier, the bucium – as well as the technologies for their making, including a craft method.
- Silvestru Lungoci (1939–1993) – grew up in a family with strong singing and shepherding traditions. From 1960, he was a member of the Ciprian Porumbescu ensemble in Suceava. He made a significant contribution to returning the large fluier to the region's musical practice. He taught at the Folk School of Arts in Suceava, where he trained a new generation of fluier players. Since 2014, a competition-festival for performers on folk wind instruments named after Silvestru Lungoci has been held annually in his home village of Horodnic de Jos. The Electrecord studio recorded several albums with him and the Ciprian Porumbescu orchestra, and also released a disc dedicated to him in the series Un virtuose des flûtes Roumaines ("A Virtuoso of the Romanian Flutes," 1974).
- Vasile Ungureanu (born 1952; Mălini, Suceava County, Bukovina) – a contemporary folk performer on the traditional Moldavian fluier. In 2025, he was awarded the title of Living Human Treasure by UNESCO.

== In modern culture ==
The characteristic sound of the large Moldavian fluier is used by contemporary performers who draw on traditional music. Among them are Florin Iordan and the group Trei parale, Mierla Neagră (Romanian for "the blackbird"), Călin Han, as well as the maker and performer Horaţiu Neagoe.

== Sources ==
- Alexandru, Tiberiu (1956). Instrumentele muzicale ale poporului romîn [The musical instruments of the Romanian people] (in Romanian). București: Editura de stat pentru literatură şi artă.
- Bartók, Béla (1975). Suchoff, Benjamin (ed.). Rumanian Folk Music. Vol. 5. Maramureș County. The Hague: Martinus Nijhoff. doi:10.1007/978-94-010-1686-5. ISBN 978-94-010-1688-9.
- Lăcătuş, Mihai (1981). Herţea, Iosif (ed.). Şuieră iarba, cântă lemnul [The grass hisses, the wood sings] (in Romanian). București: Consiliul Culturii și Educației Socialiste.
- Киселица, Василе (1990). "Пастушеская флейта «флуер лунг»: инструмент, ареал бытования, особенности исполнения" [Shepherd's flute "fluier lung": the instrument, its habitat, and performance features]. Молдавский музыкальный фольклор и его претворение в композиторском творчестве (in Russian). Кишинёв: Штиинца: 19–36.
- Sadie, Stanley; Tyrrell, John, eds. (2001). The New Grove Dictionary of Music and Musicians (2 ed.). New York: Macmillan Publishers Limited. ISBN 0-333-60800-3.
- Chiseliță, Vasile (2002). Muzica instrumentală din nordul Bucovinei. Repertoriul de fluier [Instrumental music from northern Bukovina. The fluier repertoire] (in Romanian). Chișinău: Știința. ISBN 9975-67-256-6.
- Chiseliță, Vasile (2009). "Fenomenul lăutăriei și tradiția instrumentală" [The phenomenon of lautari and the instrumental tradition]. Arta muzicală a Moldovei. Istorie și modernitate (in Romanian). Chișinău: Grafema Libris: 73–99. ISBN 978-9975-52-046-1.
- Cristescu, Constanţa (2010). Repertoriu muzical folcloric din Bucovina. Catalog Nr. 1— Surse bibliografice [Folklore musical repertoire from Bukovina. Catalogue No. 1— Bibliographic sources] (in Romanian). Suceava: Centrul cultural "Bucovina".
- Lăcătuş, Mihai (2013). "Tradiţia cântatului la fluier cu ison gâjâit" [The tradition of playing the fluier with a guttural sound]. Ghidul Iubitorilor de Folclor (in Romanian) (3). Suceava: Editura Lidana: 7–10. ISSN 2284-5593.
- Bucescu, Florin; Bârleanu, Viorel (2013). Cristescu, Constanţa (ed.). Stilul muzical arhaic din ţinutul Rădăuţilor. Studiu monografic [The archaic musical style from the Rădăuți county. Monographic study] (in Romanian). Suceava: Editura Muşatinii. ISBN 978-606-656-027-6.
- Libin, Laurence, ed. (2014b). The Grove Dictionary of Musical Instruments. Vol. 2 (Daadua — Hymn Technology Ltd) (2 ed.). New York: Oxford University Press. ISBN 978-0-19-935030-8.
- Libin, Laurence, ed. (2014e). The Grove Dictionary of Musical Instruments. Vol. 5 (Tibia — Zygmuntowicz, Samuel) (2 ed.). New York: Oxford University Press. ISBN 978-0-19-935034-6.
- Guta, Armand (2015). "From Ius Valachicum to the Vlach folkloric influences within Central Europe". Balcanica Posnaniensia. Acta et studia. 22 (1): 71–81. doi:10.14746/bp.2015.22.6.
- Dănilă, Irina Zamfira (2016). "Valori ale patrimoniului muzical folcloric bucovinean: fluieraşul Liviu Ţaran" [Values of Bukovina's folkloric musical heritage: the fluier player Liviu Ţaran]. Anuarul Muzeului Național al Literaturii Române Iași (in Romanian). IX. Iași: Editura Muzeelor Literare: 167–176.
- Voevidca, Alexandru (2017). Cristescu, Constanţa (ed.). Folclor muzical din Bucovina [Musical folklore from Bukovina] (in Romanian). Vol. II. Repertoriul muzical instrumental de joc. Partea 1. Suceava: Editura Lidana. ISBN 978-606-744-086-7.
- Papană, Ovidiu (2018a). "Fluierele semitraversiere din Moldova" [Semi-transverse flutes from Moldova]. Anuar IEF, serie nouă (in Romanian). 29 (8). Bucureşti: Editura Academiei Române: 363–368. ISSN 1220-5230.
- Papană, Ovidiu (2018b). "Fluierele semitraversiere din Moldova" [Semi-transverse flutes from Moldova]. Ghidul Iubitorilor de Folclor (in Romanian) (8). Suceava: Editura Lidana: 40–47. ISSN 2284-5593.
- Dănilă, Irina Zamfira (2018). "Un tezaur uman viu — Fluieraşul Vasile Ungureanu din Mălini, Judeţul Suceava" [A living human treasure — The fluier player Vasile Ungureanu from Mălini, Suceava County]. Ghidul Iubitorilor de Folclor (in Romanian) (8). Suceava: Editura Lidana: 97–135. ISSN 2284-5593.
- Voevidca, Alexandru (2019). Cristescu, Constanţa (ed.). Folclor muzical din Bucovina [Musical folklore from Bukovina] (in Romanian). Vol. II. Repertoriul muzical instrumental de joc. Partea 2, Cântecul vocal de joc. Suceava: Editura Lidana. ISBN 978-606-744-092-8.

=== External sources ===
- Bartók, Béla. "Collections at the Museum of Ethnography. Romanian units". bartok.neprajz.hu. Museum of Ethnography. Archived from the original on 27 April 2025.
- Niga, Leontina; Nemciuc, Trifanuca (1932). "Bocet" [Голосіння по матері]. Fonds Constantin Brailoiu (in Romanian). Archived from the original on 14 July 2025.
- Cazacu, Ilie (1936a). "Jocul cel mare din Cîmpulung, Trei leşeşti". Fonds Constantin Brailoiu (in Romanian). Archived from the original on 25 July 2025.
- Cazacu, Ilie (1936b). "Arcanul, Corabeasca, Ursareasca". Fonds Constantin Brailoiu (in Romanian). Archived from the original on 21 July 2025.
- Ursu, Mihai (1938). "Când sue viţele la munte [Когда коровы поднимаются в горы]". Fonds Constantin Brailoiu (in Romanian). Archived from the original on 21 July 2025.
- Cruceanu, Ion. "Muzeul de Etnografie, Vatra Dornei (Bucovina)". YouTube (in Romanian).
- Chiseliţă, Vasile (2011). "Când şi-a pierdut ciobanul oile" [When the shepherd lost his sheep]. Patrimoniul cultural imaterial al Republicii Moldova (in Romanian). Ministerul Culturii al Republicii Moldova. Archived from the original on 4 November 2024.
- Cazacu, Ilie. "Un rapsod al plaiurilor moldovene" [A rhapsody of the Moldavian lands]. discogs.com. Archived from the original on 25 July 2025.
- Comuna Horodnic de Jos. "In memoriam Silvestru Lungoci". horodnicdejos.ro (in Romanian). Archived from the original on 17 May 2025.
- Scoala Gimnaziala Horodnic de Jos. "Personalitati din Horodnic – Silvestru Lungoci". scoalahorodnicdejos.wordpress.com (in Romanian). Archived from the original on 25 July 2025.
- Lungoci, Silvestru. "Un Virtuose Des Flûtes Roumaines". discogs.com. Archived from the original on 25 July 2025.
- Haleux, Gregory (2021). "The Romanian National Collection of Folklore. A. The Traditional Folk Music Band. II. Bucovina". Quelque Part Quelque Chose (in French). Archived from the original on 26 July 2025.
- Черкаський (a), Л. М. "Українські народні музичні інструменти. Фрілка" [Ukrainian folk musical instruments. Frilka] (in Ukrainian). Archived from the original on 25 September 2018.
- Черкаський (b), Л. М. "Українські народні музичні інструменти. Флояра" [Ukrainian folk musical instruments. Floyara] (in Ukrainian). Archived from the original on 27 September 2018.
- dexonline (a). "Fluiera" (in Romanian). Archived from the original on 28 July 2025.
- dexonline (b). "Plai" (in Romanian). Archived from the original on 15 June 2025.
- Ungureanu, Vasile (2019). "Tezaur Uman Viu" [Living Human Treasure]. YouTube (in Romanian). tezaurumanviu.
- Trei parale. "YouTube". YouTube (in Romanian).
- Mierla Neagră. "YouTube". YouTube.
- Horaţiu Neagoe. "YouTube". YouTube.
- Călin Han. "YouTube". YouTube (in Romanian).
- IEF. "Rădăcini" [Roots]. discogs.org. Archived from the original on 6 June 2025.
