= Floyarka =

- Classification: Aerophone
- Hornbostel–Sachs classification: 421.111-2

Playing range
- c^{3}-g^{5}

Related instruments
- Sopilka; Frilka; Floyara; Zubivka

The floyarka (Ukrainian: Флоярка) is a type of sopilka, a traditional Ukrainian flute. It is characterized as an open-ended notched flute. The floyarka is a larger version of the frilka.

The floyarka is a pipe of approximately a 30 cm in length, (approximately 10 cm longer than the frilka). Traditionally, a floyarka had six holes, although now ten holes are also common. One end is sharpened and the breath is broken against one of the sides of the tube at the playing end. The mouthpiece is sharpened into a cone-like edge and the instrument produces a sound similar to that of the flute.

The floyarka was often played at funerals in the Carpathian Mountains. Shepherds were also able to accompany themselves with glutteral humming which produced an ostinato tone or drone.

The floyarka is often called a frilka or sometimes zubivka in central Ukraine.

The name is rather a contaminant from a Greek-Romanian filiation (more spread is the Slavic sopilka).

== See also ==
- Ukrainian folk music

== Sources ==
- Humeniuk, A. - Ukrainski narodni muzychni instrumenty - Kyiv: Naukova dumka, 1967
- Mizynec, V. - Ukrainian Folk Instruments - Melbourne: Bayda books, 1984
- Cherkaskyi, L. - Ukrainski narodni muzychni instrumenty // Tekhnika, Kyiv, Ukraine, 2003 - 262 pages. ISBN 966-575-111-5
