= Floyara =

- Classification: Aerophone
- Hornbostel–Sachs classification: 421.111-2

Playing range
- c^{3}-g^{5}

Related instruments
- Sopilka; Floyarka; Frilka; Zubivka

The floyara (Ukrainian: Флояра; Romanian fluier; comes from Latin: flabellum — «fan») (Floyarka) is a more perfected form of the sopilka. It is characterized as an open ended notched flute. The floyara is a pipe of approximately a metre in length. One end is sharpened and the breath is broken against one of the sides of the tube at the playing end. Six holes in groups of three are burnt out in the centre of the instrument. It was often played at funerals in the Carpathian Mountains. The floyarka is a smaller version of the floyara and is similar to the sopilka and frilka. The floyara is approximately 60 cm (24 in) long. The mouthpiece is sharpened into a cone-like edge and the instrument produces a sound similar to that of the flute. Shepherds were also able to accompany themselves with glutteral humming which produced an ostinato tone or drone. The floyarka is often called a frilka or sometimes zubivka in central Ukraine.

The name is rather a contaminant from a Greek-Romanian filiation (more spread is the Slavic sopilka).

== See also ==
- Ukrainian folk music

== Sources ==
- Humeniuk, A. - Ukrainski narodni muzychni instrumenty - Kyiv: Naukova dumka, 1967
- Mizynec, V. - Ukrainian Folk Instruments - Melbourne: Bayda books, 1984
- Cherkaskyi, L. - Ukrainski narodni muzychni instrumenty // Tekhnika, Kyiv, Ukraine, 2003 - 262 pages. ISBN 966-575-111-5
