= Sopilka =

Ukrainian woodwind instrument of the flute family

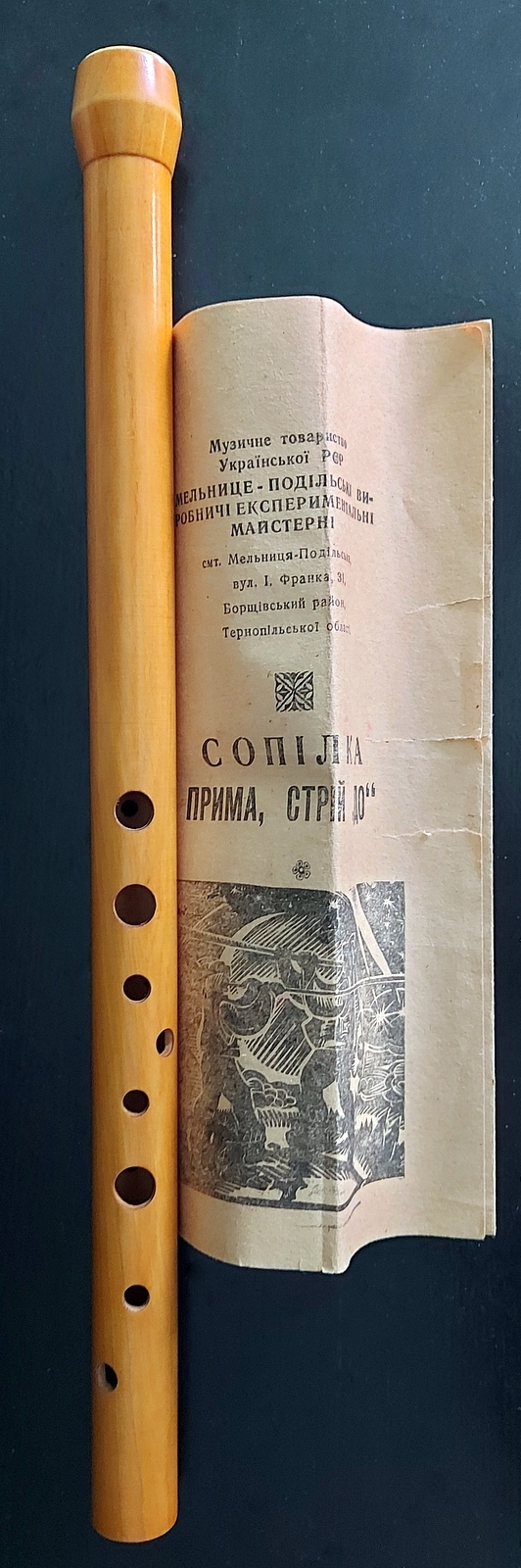
- Sopilka Prima

Woodwind instrument
- Classification: Woodwind
- Hornbostel–Sachs classification: 421.111-12

Playing range
- C^{3}–G^{5}

Related instruments
- Floyara; Frilka; Zubivka

Sopilka (Ukrainian: Cопiлка) is a name applied to a variety of woodwind instruments of the end-blown flute family used by Ukrainian folk instrumentalists. Sopilka most commonly refers to a fife made of a variety of materials (but traditionally out of elderberry or viburnum wood) that has six to ten finger holes. The term is also used to describe a related set of folk instruments similar to the recorder, incorporating a fipple and having a constricted end.

Sopilkas are used by a variety of Ukrainian folkloric ensembles recreating the traditional music of the various sub-ethnicities in western Ukraine, most notably that of the Hutsuls of the Carpathian Mountains. Often employing several sopilkas in concert, a skilled performer can mimic a variety of nature sounds including bird-calls and insects.

== History ==
Sopilka is one of the oldest music instruments: the earliest known sopilka ever found is made of mammoth-bone and is from the Paleolithic age. It is also depicted in many 11th century's stories and paintings, such as a fresco in Saint Sophia Cathedral, Kyiv. At first, it used to be solely a folk instrument, played by shepherds or by trios (named troisti myzyky) and sometimes played during weddings. It is also cited in the play The Forest Song by Lesya Ukrainka.

== Modern usage ==
With the development of the 10 hole fingering instruments in 1967, sopilkas became part of the music education system in Ukraine. Pop groups began to use the instrument in their performances. The first was the folk rock group Kobza. More recently, the sopilka has found its way into the music of singer Ruslana, folk rock band Haydamaky, speed folk group Kubasonics, folktronica bands Onuka and Kazka, and flautist Ihor Didenchuk from the folktronica groups Go_A and Kalush.

== Varieties ==
There are many types of flute-like instruments in Ukraine. Some varieties include dentsivka (including dvodentsivka and pivtoradentsivka), dudka-vykrutka, floyara, floyarka, frilka, telenka, and zubivka.

== Gallery ==
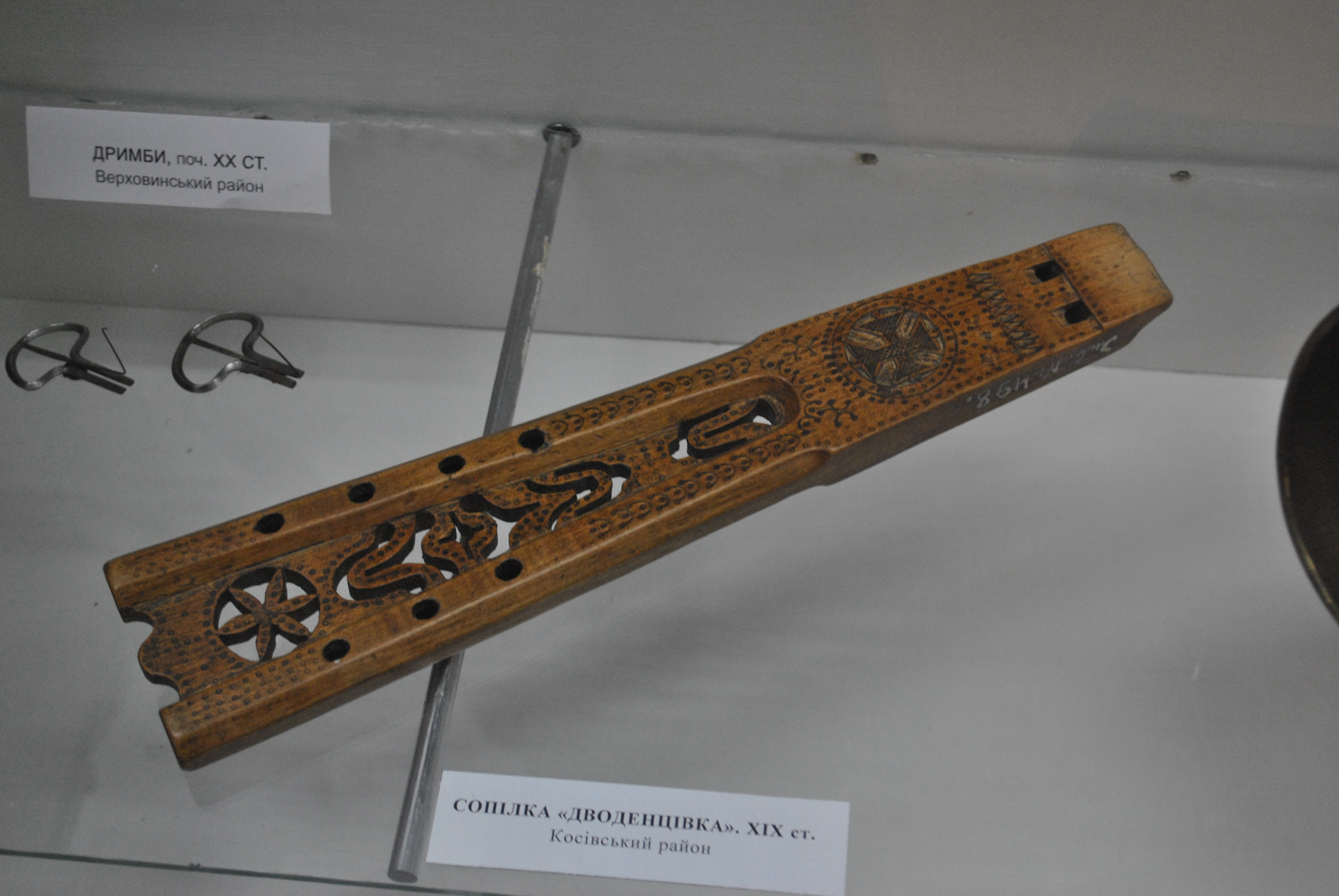
Dvodentsivka (double dentsivka) from 19th century

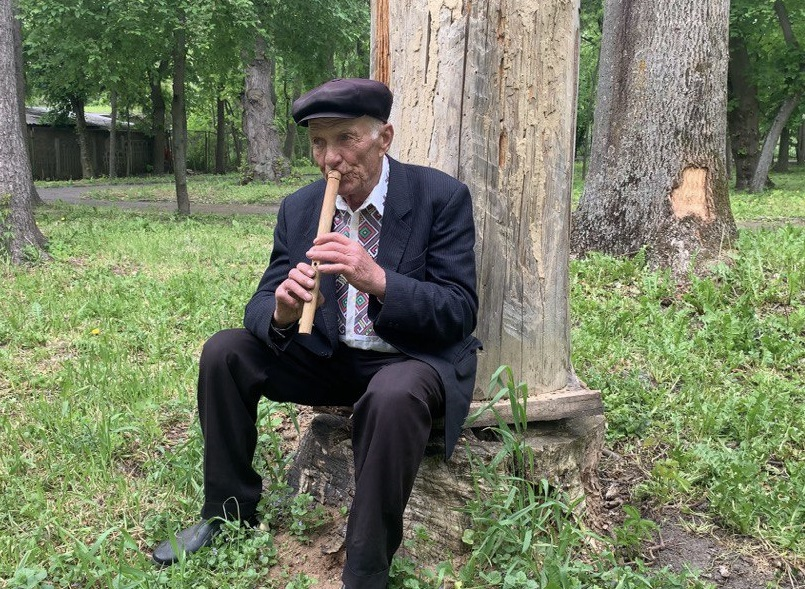
A shepherd from Polissia playing dudka-vykrutka, a local variety of sopilka

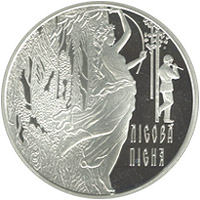
Lukash (playing the sopilka) and Mavka from The Forest Song on the reverse of the silver jubilee coin of the NBU

== See also ==
- Ukrainian folk music

== Sources ==
- Dverij, R. – Shkola hry na khromatychnii sopiltsi - Lviv, 2008. - Part 1 - 72 pages, part 2 - 68 pages, part 3 - 64 pages.
- Humeniuk, A. – Ukrainski narodni muzychni instrumenty - Kyiv: Naukova dumka, 1967
- Mizynec, V. – Ukrainian Folk Instruments - Melbourne: Bayda books, 1984
- Cherkaskyi, L. – Ukrainski narodni muzychni instrumenty - Tekhnika, Kyiv, Ukraine, 2003 - 262 pages. ISBN 966-575-111-5
