= Leading the bear =

Slavic carnival tradition

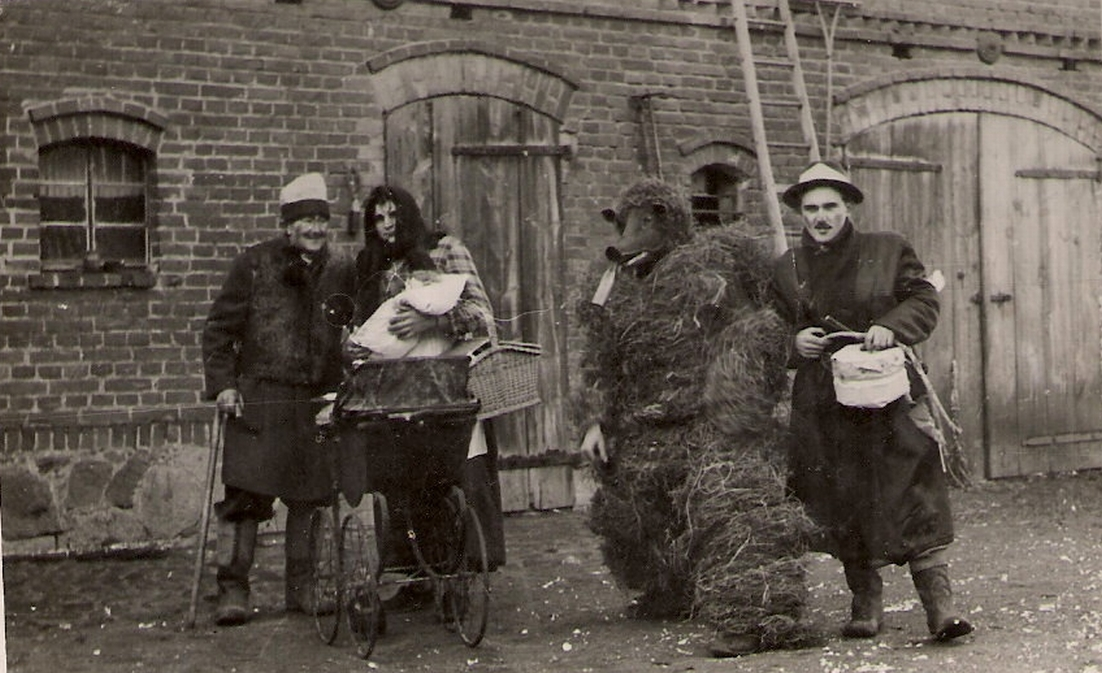
From the Polish village of Podmokle Wielkie in the 1950s.

Leading the bear (Silesian: Wodzynie bera) is a Slavic carnival tradition. It enjoyed brief popularity in the entire Slavic region, the practice still takes place in the areas of Upper Silesia, especially in the Opole Voivodeship.

A colorful procession of disguised people goes from house to house through the village, leading on a bear's rope. The "bear" is tied in pea or straw ropes braided into plaits, on its head it has a tall straw hat with a bell. Another variation of the outfit was a set consisting of a sheepskin coat turned with the hair on top and a fur hat on the head. The typical composition of the retinue is: a young couple, a chimney sweep, a doctor, a forester, a devil, a priest, a chemist, a gypsy girl, a camel, a policeman, a butcher, musicians (accordion, drum), bridesmaids and groomsmen, a thief, and a newsboy.

One of the first to mention about leading a bear was Józef Lompa in 1842. He supposes that this custom dates back to the fourteenth or fifteenth century, when in Silesia you could still meet bears, sometimes wreaking havoc in peasant farms. Currently, when the procession is approaching the house, its members are trying to buy themselves from misfortunes with money, sweets or alcohol. In the past, they bought eggs, gingerbread or flour. The leading of the bear takes place most often on the penultimate Saturday of the carnival.

== In the Eastern Slavic region ==
In Russia and Ukraine, during New Year's Eve, processions with a dressed-up bear and a goat pass through the villages. In the old days, there were frequent processions with a live human-led bear as well as the Bear Dance in the group of the so-called skomorokhs. Dishes are prepared for the bear, such as mamaliga or pierogi, to bribe it so that it does not damage people's property. The bear is also invited to dinner at Maslenitsa.

== In the South Slavic region ==
In January, at Saint Sebastian on 14 January, in Serbia and Bulgaria, to protect the bear against the bear's hunt, it is given boiled corn overnight, i.e. mamaliga, corn grains or bread.
