= Zubivka =

- Classification: Aerophone
- Hornbostel–Sachs classification: 421.111-12

Playing range
- c^{3}-g^{5}

Related instruments
- Beregfogaras; Skosivka; Skisna Dudka; Frukanka; Telenka; Frilka

The zubivka (Ukrainian: Зубівка, Hungarian: Beregfogaras), also known as skosivka, skisna dudka, or frukanka, is considered one of the oldest folk wind instruments in Ukraine and is found primarily in the Carpathian region.

It was first described by wandering Arabic scholars in the 11th century. This instrument is very similar to the telenka, only instead of having a fipple, it is played like the sopilka or frilka, by having the breath break against the side of the pipe. This surface is wedge-shaped. The zubivka is usually approximately 60 cm (24 in) long.

== Related instruments ==
As with many Ukrainian folk instruments played in the Carpathians, the zubivka is also known and played by musicians in other ethnic groups in contact with the Ukrainians.

== See also ==
- Ukrainian folk music

== Sources ==
- Humeniuk, A. - Ukrainski narodni muzychni instrumenty - Kyiv: Naukova dumka, 1967
- Mizynec, V. - Ukrainian Folk Instruments - Melbourne: Bayda books, 1984
- Cherkaskyi, L. - Ukrainski narodni muzychni instrumenty // Tekhnika, Kyiv, Ukraine, 2003 - 262 pages. ISBN 966-575-111-5
