= Frilka =

Traditional Ukrainian flute

Sopilka
- Classification: Aerophone
- Hornbostel–Sachs classification: 421.111-2

Playing range
- c^{3}-g^{5}

Related instruments
- Sopilka; Floyara; Floyarka; Zubivka

The frilka (Ukrainian: Фрілка) is a more perfected form of the sopilka, a traditional Ukrainian flute. The frilka is a smaller version of the floyarka.

The frilka is characterized as an open-ended notched flute. It is a pipe of approximately a 20 cm (8 inches) in length. One end is sharpened and the breath is broken against one of the sides of the tube at the playing end. Six holes (now often 10) in groups of three are burnt out in the center of the instrument.

It was often played at funerals in the Carpathian Mountains. Shepherds were also able to accompany themselves with glutteral humming which produced an ostinato tone or drone.

The frilka is often called a floyarka or sometimes zubivka in central Ukraine.

== See also ==
- Ukrainian folk music

== Sources ==
- Humeniuk, A. - Ukrainski narodni muzychni instrumenty - Kyiv: Naukova dumka, 1967
- Mizynec, V. - Ukrainian Folk Instruments - Melbourne: Bayda books, 1984
- Cherkaskyi, L. - Ukrainski narodni muzychni instrumenty // Tekhnika, Kyiv, Ukraine, 2003 - 262 pages. ISBN 966-575-111-5
