= Capra (goat dance) =

Romanian traditional dance

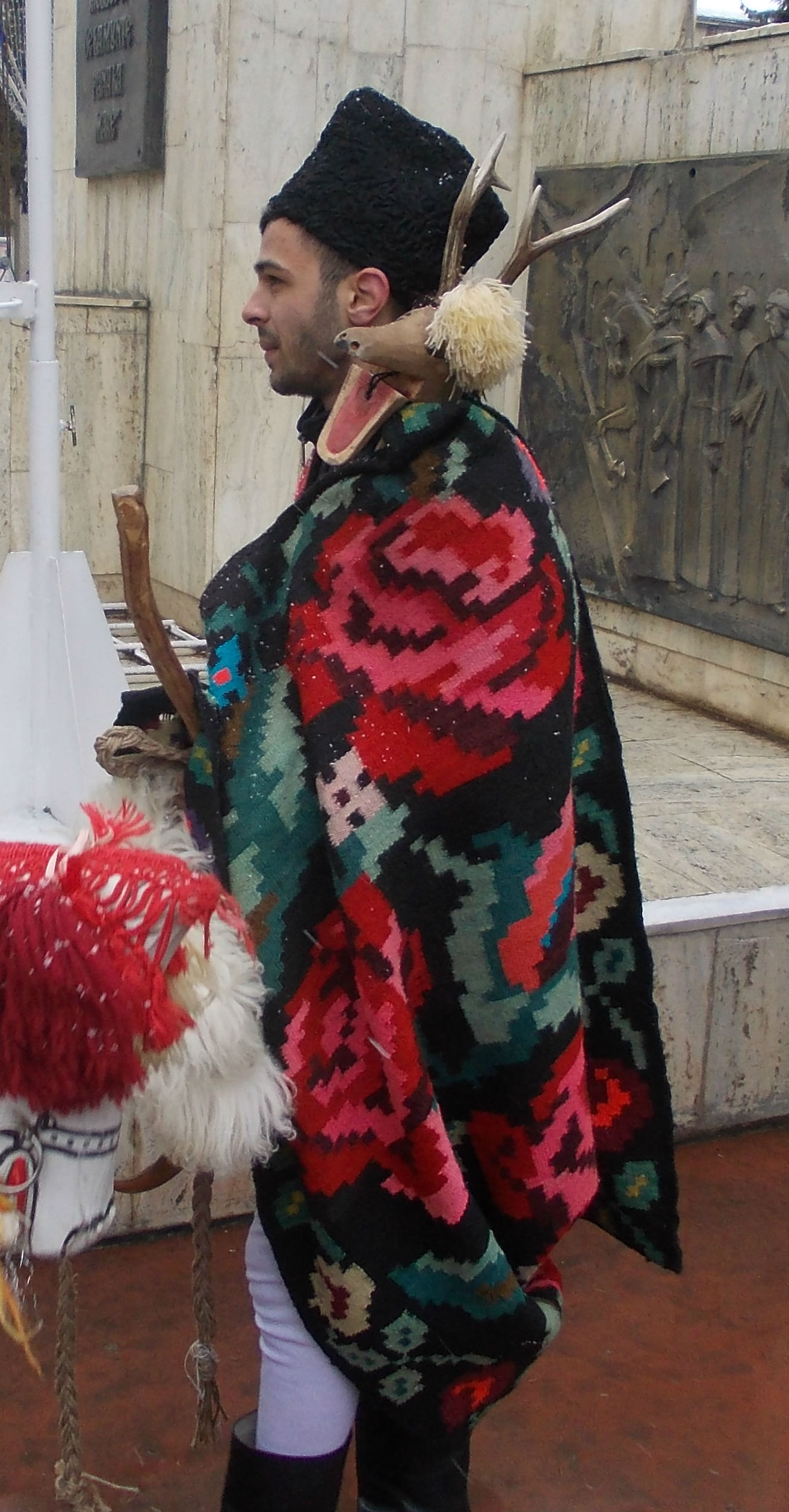
Capra dancer in Piatra Neamț

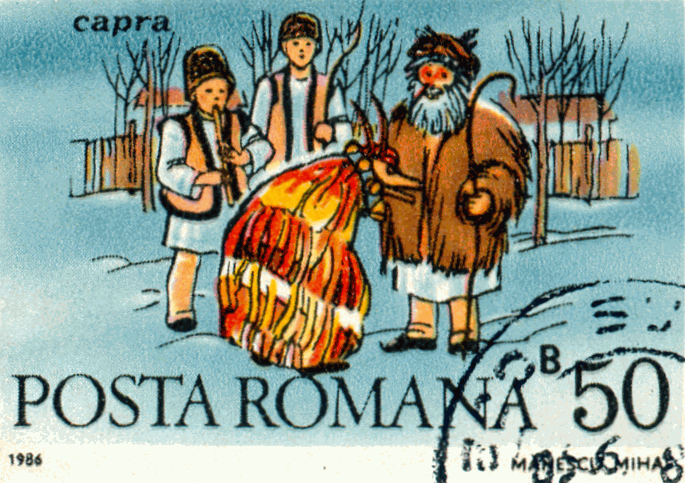
Capra, Romanian stamp from 1986

Capra is the name of a traditional Romanian dance, performed around New Year. It's executed by a young man with a goat mask and a sheep skin on his back. The 'goat' and his companions go from house to house, dancing at each door on New Year's Eve. This custom was first mentioned in 1656, when the Swedish ambassador to Moldavia visited Iași and described the custom in which the dancing ended when the goat was shot by an arrow. In his 1796 book, Descriptio Moldaviae, Dimitrie Cantemir devoted a paragraph to this custom.

During the 19th century, Romanians believed goats could predict the year's weather, and the Capra dance, considered a pagan dance, became a ritual to bring fertility. It has become a component of folklore culture.

== See also ==
- Kukeri
- Mari Lwyd
- Hoodening
