= Music of Romania =

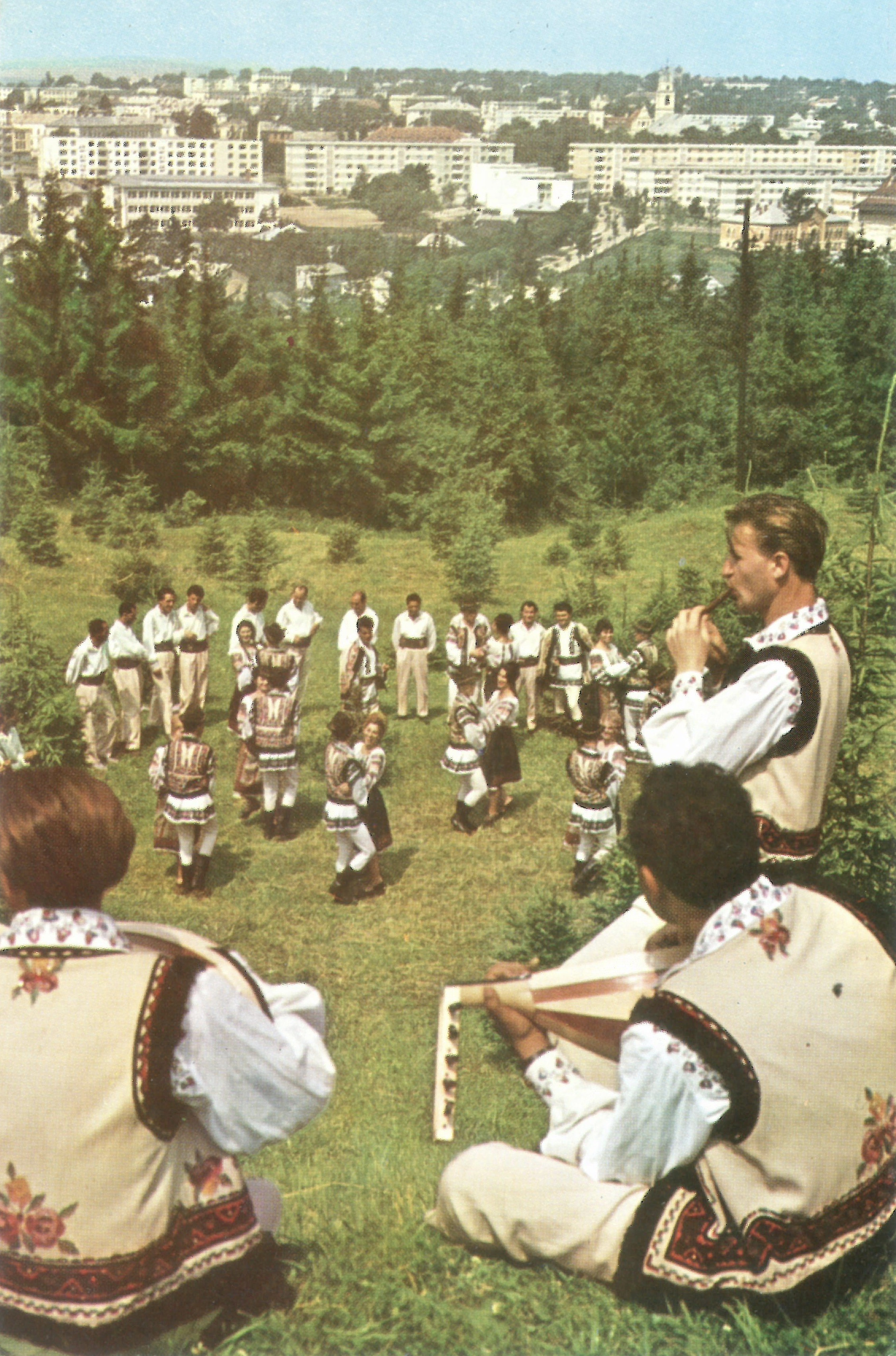
Postcard depicting a group of Romanian folk musicians and dancers dressed in traditional costumes.

Romania has a diverse music genre which includes traditional music. Traditional Romanian folk music remains popular with some folk musicians achieving national and international fame.

== History ==
Romanian folk music is considered the oldest form of Romanian music and has strongly influenced the country's sacred and secular art music. Conservation of Romanian folk music has been aided by a large and enduring audience and by numerous performers who helped preserve and popularize Romanian folk music. One of them, Gheorghe Zamfir, is noted to have helped popularize a traditional Romanian folk instrument, the panpipes.

Romanian sacred music, which developed under the influence of Byzantine music and adapted to the intonations of indigenous folk music, saw a golden age between the 15th and 17th centuries, when schools of liturgical music developed within Romanian monasteries. Western influence exposed religious music to polyphony in the 18th century, and a series of Romanian composers continued to develop the genre into the 19th and 20th.

== Traditional music ==
Traditional Romanian music reflects a confluence of sounds similar to the traditional music of Central Europe (that is, primarily, Hungary) and of the Balkans. Romanian folk music fronts melody, frequently carried by the violin, rather than percussion or harmony. The melodies themselves and especially the melodic embellishments are reminiscent of music in the Balkans.

Traditional Romanian song featuring a taragot.

=== The Banat region ===
In Banat, the violin is the most common folk instrument, now played alongside imported woodwinds; also important is the taragot (whose role is now often filled by the saxophone). Efta Botoca is among the most renowned violinists from Banat.

=== The Bucovina region ===
Bucovina is a remote province and its traditions include some of the most ancient Romanian instruments, such as the țilincă and the cobza. Pipes (a small pipe called fluieraș and a larger instrument called fluier mare) are also played, usually with accompaniment by a cobza (or, more recently, the accordion). Violins and brass instruments have been imported in modern times.

=== The Crișana region ===
Crișana has an ancient tradition of using violins, often in duos—an older tradition than the similar format found in Transylvania. Petrică Pașca has recently helped popularize the taragot in the region. Also, in Roșia village are well known two local instruments: hidede, a type of violin with the bell of a trumpet replacing the sound box; and a type of drum called dobă.

=== Northern Dobrogea ===
Dobrujan music is characterized by Balkan and Turkish rhythm and melodicism. Dobrogea's population is ethnically mixed and the music here has a heavier Turkish, Bulgarian, Tatar and Ukrainian import than in the rest of the country.

=== Maramureș and Oaș ===
The typical folk ensemble from Maramureș is zongora and violin, often with drums. Maramureș is a remote province (like Bucovina) and its traditions include some of the most ancient Romanian instruments and peasant music. Its music shares many features with that of Bucovina. Traditional flutes include the țilincă and fluierul gemanat (similar to the Bulgarian dvoyanka). Taragot, saxophones and accordions have more recently been introduced. Traditional singing in this region includes doina.

In Oaș, a violin adapted to be shriller is used, accompanied by the zongora. The singing in this region is also unique, shrill with archaic melodic elements.

=== Moldavia (Moldova) ===
See: Music of Moldova

Violin and țambal are the modern format most common in Moldavian dance music. Prior to the 20th century, however, the violin was usually accompanied by the cobza, which, although very rare, is still in use today. Brass ensembles are now found in the central part of the country. Moldavia is also known for brass bands similar to those in Serbia.

=== Transylvania ===
Transylvania has been historically and culturally more linked to Central European countries than to Southeastern Europe, and its music reflects those influences. The province is tied historically to the smaller western regions of Maramureș, Criana and Banat and they are often referred to collectively as Transylvania.

Violin, kontra and double bass, sometimes with a cimbalom, are the most integral ensemble unit. All these instruments are used to play a wide variety of songs, including numerous kinds of specific wedding songs.

Drum, guitar and violin make up the typical band in Maramureș and virtuoso fiddlers are also popular in the area. In the end of the 1990s, the Maramuzical music festival was organized to draw attention to the indigenous music of the area.

=== Wallachia ===
Wallachia, consisting of Muntenia and Oltenia, is home to the taraf bands, which are perhaps the best-known expression of Romanian folk culture. Dances associated with tarafs include brâu, geamparale, sârbă and hora. The fiddle leads the music, with the cimbalom and double bass accompanying it. The cobza, once widespread in the region, has been largely replaced by the cimbalom. Lyrics are often about heroes like the haidouks. Taraf de Haïdouks is an especially famous taraf and have achieved international attention since their 1988 debut with the label Ocora. The Haidouks first attained visibility as lăutari, traditional entertainers at weddings and other celebratory occasions.

=== Oltenia ===
Oltenia's folk music and dance are similar to those in Muntenia. Violins and pipes are used, as are țambal and guitar, replacing the cobza as the rhythmic backing for tarafs.

=== Muntenia ===
Muntenia has a diverse set of instrumentation. The flute (fluier in Romanian) and violin are the traditional melodic element, but now clarinets and accordions are more often used. Accordionists include the performers Vasile Pandelescu and Ilie Udilă.

=== Doina ===
The most widespread form of Romanian folk music is the doina. Other styles of folk music include the bocet ("lament") and cântec bătrânesc (traditional epic ballads; literally "song of the elders").

Doina is poetic and often melancholic, sometimes compared to the blues for that reason. Doinas are often played with a slow, free rhythm melody against a fast accompaniment pattern in fixed tempo, giving an overall feeling of rhythmic tension. Melodies are sometimes repeated in differing songs and typically follow a descending pattern.

Regional styles of doina:

- Doină cu noduri - an archaic doina with a "knotted" glottal technique (Oltenia, Maramureş, Oaş, Lăpuş)
- Ca pe luncă - found along the southern Danube
- De codru - codru means "forest"
- Hore lungă - means "long dance", from the region of Maramureș, Transylvania
- Klezmer - originally played by Jewish musicians from Bessarabia and Moldavia
- Oltului - found along the River Olt

Other styles of doina:

- Ca din tulnic - unique type in which the melody imitates a type of bugle called the tulnic
- Ciobanul - shepherd's doina
- De dragoste - popular form, usually about love; dragoste means "love".
- De jale - mellow, mournful doina; jale means "grief".
- De leagăn - a lullaby; leagăn means "cradle".
- De pahar - drinking song; pahar means "drinking glass".
- Foaie verde - classical form; literally "green leaves".

=== Musical poems ===
A syncretic genre exists at the intersection of narrative structure, musical expression, ritual function, and dramatic progression. One of the most well-known examples is the archaic pastoral poem When the shepherd lost his sheep.

== Classical music ==
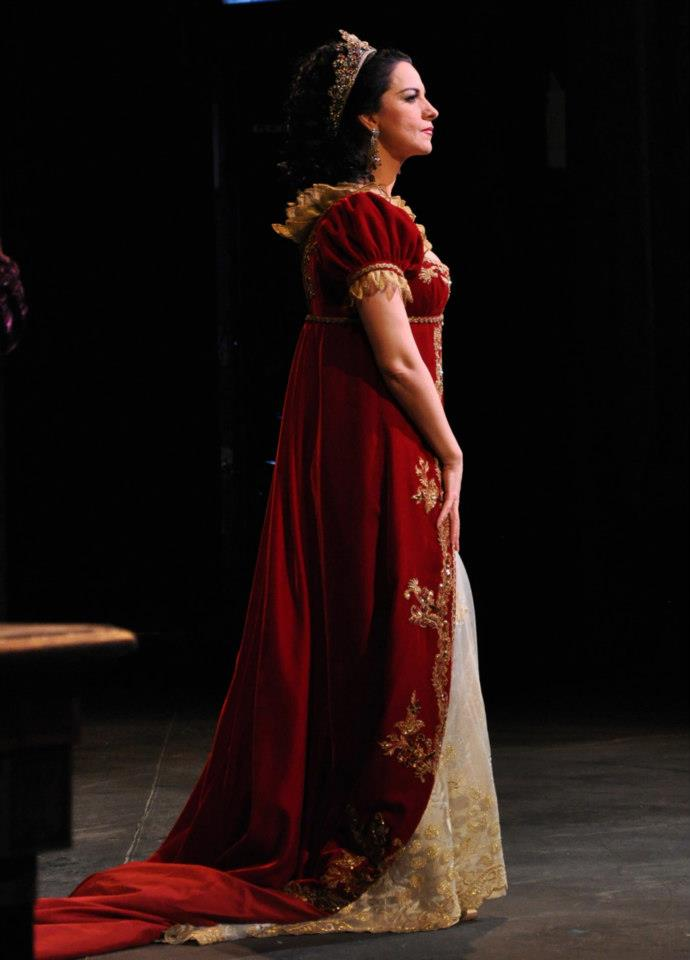
Angela Gheorghiu is one of the best-known Romanian sopranos

Notable Romanian composers of the 19th and 20th centuries include Ciprian Porumbescu, Anton Pann, Eduard Caudella, Mihail Jora, Dinu Lipatti and especially George Enescu. Also famous are Sergiu Celibidache and Vladimir Cosma, both of whom are known for both composition and conducting.

The Australian composer Julian Cochran wrote a set of Romanian Dances for piano and violin, and another set for chamber orchestra, exemplifying affinity amongst classical composers with the Romanian folk music tradition outside of Romania..

And from the second half of the 20th century by the Romanian spectralism school: Ştefan Niculescu, Horațiu Rădulescu, Iancu Dumitrescu, Octavian Nemescu, Ana-Maria Avram and others.

== Jazz ==
Jazz has been imported in Romania as early as the interwar period, thanks to musicians such as Sergiu Malagamba. However, jazz music was banned after World War II, with the arrival of the communist regime. The ban was dropped in 1964.

Promoted but not limited to Cornel Chiriac, jazz musicians and others such as Eugen Ciceu, helped establish the genre in Romania, initially promoted alongside "easy music". Vocalist Aura Urziceanu has performed in New York City in 1972 and toured extensively under the name Aura Rully.

Although restrained, jazz after 1989 still has cult following, with a number of festivals such as Gărâna International Jazz Festival. Contemporary jazz singers include Johnny Răducanu, Anca Parghel and others. In recent years a few bands have emerged that make use of elements of nu-jazz, trip hop and electronic music: Aievea, Jazzadezz, Norzeatic & Khidja and others.

== Popular music ==
=== Rock ===
Romanian rock music has a great history with an array of influences. During the 1980s, bands such as Iris, Phoenix, Celelalte Cuvinte, Compact, Holograf or Cargo achieved popularity, with songs about love and friendship. Contemporary popular Romanian rock bands include Vița de Vie, Robin and the Backstabbers, Coma, Alternosfera, Vama, Luna Amară, The Kryptonite Sparks, and Grimus.

=== Muzică uşoară românească ===
The term could be translated literally as "Romanian Easy Music" and, in the most common sense, this music is synonymous with "Muzică de stradă" (from French "estrade", which means "podium"), defining a branch of Pop music developed in Romania after World War II, which appears generally in the form of easy danceable songs, made on arrangements, which are performed by orchestras (and lately pop bands), following a mix of the Soviet and Western pop music influences. This musical form shows many similarities with Western Popular music, as most songs could be defined as a form of Schlager. It supported influences from other similar melodic styles, like Musica leggera italiana (from Italy) and Canción Melódica (from Spain). This Romanian style of music was popularized abroad through the international Golden Stag Festival, held in Brașov, since 1968. The most representative singers of that era are those from the 1980s, 1970s and rarely, the 1960s: Aurelian Andreescu, Elena Cârstea, Corina Chiriac, Mirabela Dauer, Stela Enache, Luigi Ionescu, Horia Moculescu, Margareta Pâslaru, Angela Similea, Dan Spătaru and Aura Urziceanu.

=== Romanţe ===
Romanţă (plural: romanţe) is a vocal or instrumental musical piece, sung in a poetic and sentimental mood. It appears as an accessible and expressive melody, on the background of piano and guitar orchestral arrangements. It presents similarities to British music style "Easy Music". The history of Romanian romanţe can be traced back until the Interwar period, when it became famous through the agency of the most popular Romanian singer of that time, Marin Teodorescu, who is better known as Zavaidoc. After World War II, singers like Gică Petrescu integrated in this music orchestral elements, which are specific for Argentinian style, Tango Nuevo.

=== Folclor Suburban ===
==== Manele ====
Anton Pann had the first few transcriptions of a new style that was present in the suburbs of Bucharest in the 19th century. The new style flourished and grew, being promoted by ordinary musicians playing in suburbs called Mahala. This musical style combined the Balkan (many traditional folkloric genres, including Turkish) and Romani styles into a new style called Manele. After the Romanian Revolution in 1990, this genre was booming. A few contemporary bands that promoted the style are:

- Azur (vocalist: Nelu Vlad) - the first band to use electronic beats
- Albatros (vocalist: Iolanda Cristea a.k.a. Naste din Berceni)
- Generic (vocalist: Dan Ciotoi)
- Miracol C (vocalist: Cezar Duţu a.k.a. Cezărică)
- Odeon (vocalist: Costel Geambaşu)
- Real B (vocalist: Cristian Rizescu)
- Tomis Junior (from Galați)

Some modern manele singers, among others, are:

- Guță
- Florin Salam
- Vali Vijelie

==== Etno ====
Etno music is a popular Romanian style, which keeps most accurate the typical ethnic sound of Romanian traditional folk music. It is adapted to the modern sound of music, as employs frequently synthesizers along with the typical traditional instruments. It emerged in the early 1990s as a revival of Romanian traditional folk music and maintained a constant popularity until nowadays. It has the largest audience through the fans of Romanian folk music and it is popularized, along with Romanian folk music, through the medium of Etno TV, a Romanian Television, dedicated mainly to Romanian folk music, especially the modern side of this music.

=== Contemporary Romanian folk ===
Acoustic Romanian style of music, inspired by American folk music, with sweet lyrics and played almost exclusively with guitar. Generally, it evokes a poetic and melancholic atmosphere. It emerged in the early 1960s, along with the first releases of Phoenix band. It was promoted later, through the medium of the Cenaclul Flacăra, a cultural phenomenon from the 1970s and the first half of the 1980s, which was initiated by Adrian Păunescu, a Romanian poet. Many Romanian folk artists gain affirmation through the Cenaclul Flacăra movement: Mircea Vintilă, Vasile Șeicaru, Florian Pittiș, Valeriu Sterian, Nicu Alifantis, Alexandru Zărnescu, Victor Socaciu, Vasile Mardare.

== Rock music ==
From the early years of the communist regime (the 1960s) there was an active rock scene in Romania. Because of their free attitude which was associated with Western culture and the capitalist society, the communist regime censored rock musicians as much as possible. From the beginning they had a "paria" social position. Symbols of the movement such as long hair, jeans, stage attitude were considered decadent. The bands operated under the name of "instrumental-vocal musical ensemble" to avoid the expression "rock", which was considered to be subversive. Despite this, the rock scene resisted with consequence in a kind of "official underground" before the 1989 Revolution.

Veterans of the scene kept the rock spirit alive under difficult restrictive conditions. The connection with the "news" from the West was made within radio stations such "Free Europe", which were disallowed. Rock was in these troubled times for its Romanian supporters more than music. It was attitude against the lack of freedom. Names with historical resonance for the Romanian rock movement include Phoenix, Sfinx, Roșu și Negru, Mondial, Sincron, Sideral, Semnal M, Metropol, FFN, Progresiv TM, Pro Musica, Catena, Iris, Compact, Holograf, Timpuri Noi, Krypton, Cargo, Celelalte Cuvinte, Post Scriptum, Florian Pittiș, Cornel Chiriac, Dan Andrei Aldea, Octave Octavian Teodorescu, Sorin Chifiriuc, Nicu Covaci, Valeriu Sterian, Mircea Baniciu, Ovidiu Lipan, Ilie Stepan, Liviu Tudan, Mircea Florian, Dorin Liviu Zaharia, Teo Peter, Florin Ochescu, Cristi Minculescu, Dan Bittman.

The political freedom and the cultural openness gained after the 1989 Revolution marked a new era for rock music in Romania. The scene is now very active, despite rock music not being one of the main acts in Romanian mass media. Rock clubs have a rich list of concerts. There are yearly organized great rock festivals with national and international character.

=== Mainstream ===
In the 1990s and the early 2000s, with the emergence of independent television and radio stations, the term easy music has been replaced by pop. Mainstream success is shared between early dance-pop bands such as A.S.I.A., Animal X, Blondy, Body & Soul, L.A., 3rei Sud Est or Akcent, pop-rock singers and bands such as Ștefan Bănică Jr., Holograf, Bosquito, Voltaj or VH2, hip-hop outfits such as B.U.G. Mafia, La Familia, Paraziții or Ca$$a Loco, Latino singers (Pepe) and others (the electronic band Șuie Paparude and alternative rock bands such as Vama Veche, Bere Gratis, Sarmalele Reci, OCS, Spitalul de Urgență, Zdob și Zdub or Luna Amară that are still popular, especially underground).

== Romanian pop music ==
With the exception of Moldavian-based band O-Zone, Romanian Europop had not achieved considerable echoes outside the borders of the country until 2005, when the band Morandi reached success with songs written in English, Brazilian-Portuguese and other languages. The music style of Morandi, DJ Project, Fly Project and a few others marks the transitional period to the Romanian dance-pop of the late 2000s and early 2010s.

Artists such as Edward Maya, Vika Jigulina, Alexandra Stan, Andreea Bănică, Smiley, Inna, Andreea Bălan, Antonia, David Deejay, Play & Win and Radio Killer brought a new sound that has managed to achieve commercial success outside Romania and dominate the national TV and radio music charts. This new sound, nicknamed pejoratively by some "popcorn" features simple lyrics written most often in English, accompanied by videos frequently featuring young women. "Popcorn" has been criticized by some as superficial (sometimes being even compared to Manele), overly commercial, repetitive and easily grating, as a large number of producers and performers have adopted this sound in a short period of time. However, since Romanian spectralism is virtually unknown outside the avant-garde music community, "popcorn" may be considered the first movement in the history of Romanian music to gain momentum.

== House music ==
An important influence on Romanian dance-pop was house music, which gained so much following in clubs that, thanks to radio stations such as Pro FM, has attained mainstream status. Minimal house in the vein of Ricardo Villalobos has and is being produced by DJs such as Petre Inspirescu, but vocal-based house continues to have more success. As of recently, dubstep has emerged alongside house music, although currently still underground.

=== Underground music ===
Pre-1989 underground bands include the new-wave band Rodion G.A. alongside older rock bands such as Celelalte Cuvinte and Semnal M. The first electronic music attempts belong to composer Adrian Enescu.

First represented by bands such as Vorbire Directă and R.A.C.L.A., hip-hop music has achieved quickly mainstream success with bands such as B.U.G. Mafia, La Familia and Paraziții, in spite of them being criticized for delivering explicit language and themes. The scene is currently split between mainstream rappers (Puya, Guess Who) and underground rappers (Vexxatu Vexx, CTC., Haarp Cord). Labels dedicated to hip-hop include Hades Records, 20 CM Records and Facem Records (the first independent hip-hop label from Romania).

Rock scene is currently split between metal bands (such as Negură Bunget and Trooper), progressive and indie rock outfits (byron, Kumm, Robin and the Backstabbers). There are also other niches such as punk rock (E.M.I.L. Haos, Terror Art) or post-rock (Valerinne).

Underground electronic music scene has been until 2010 somewhat unified by the existence of the Timișoara-based festival TMBase, reuniting DJs and producers from genres such as drum and bass, breakbeat, dub techno, electronic rock etc. A result of TMBase collaborations is the IDM outfit Makunouchi Bento, who have attracted some attention with their Bandcamp-released material. Also notable is the label La Strada Music, which has been home to names such as Silent Strike (who has gained acclaim on the Internet and some radio stations with the single Astenie featuring Ada Milea), Yvat (a prolific IDM producer of Belgian origin, based in Bucharest), Electric Brother, nu-jazz outfit Aievea and others.

Trip hop and post-rock have influenced a few bands such as Margento, but dream pop, shoegaze and other niche genres are poorly represented. Freak folk is partially known due to the success of singer-songwriter Ada Milea, but is practiced by only a few other bands such as Nu & Apa Neagră. The producer Minus has attempted to introduce bitpop and, more recently, chillwave.

Dubstep DJs have started to emerge, though with the genre has also been associated the band R.O.A., who have achieved some mainstream success thanks to the leader Junkyard, formerly vocalist in Șuie Paparude.

== Music festivals ==
Jazz festivals

- Bucharest Masters of Jazz Festival - Bucharest
- EUROPAfest, Bucharest - international festival - blues, jazz, pop, classic
- Gărâna Jazz Festival - Gărâna, Caraș-Severin
- Jazzy Spring Festival Bucharest, Bucharest
- Jazz and More, Sibiu
- Sibiu Jazz Festival - Sibiu
- Festivalul Internațional "Richard Oschanitzky", Iaşi
- Timișoara Jazz Festival - Timișoara
- Transilvania Jazz Festival - Cluj-Napoca
- Jazz in the Park - Brașov

Electronic Music

- Untold Festival - Cluj-Napoca, Untold Festival
- Electric Castle - Cluj-Napoca
- AWAKE Festival
- Neversea Festival
- Golden Stag Festival - Brașov - muzică ușoară
- Artmania Festival - Sibiu - Transylvanian Music and Arts Festival - mainly rock music
- Peninsula Festival - Târgu Mureș - rock, metal, pop, electro
- Transilvania International Guitar Festival - Cluj-Napoca
- Steaua de Cristal - Gura Humorului - International Festival of Pop Music for Children and Youth "Crystal Star"
- The International George Enescu Festival
- Terra Siculorum International Classical Guitar Festival (each year at middle of April)
- Harmonia Cordis International Classical Guitar Festival (each year at ending of August or at beginning of September)
- ABC Festival - Arad - electro
- Sunwaves Festival - Mamaia

== See also ==
- List of music released by Romanian artists that has charted in major music markets
- List of Romanian musicians
- List of Romanian singers
- Hăulit
- Fifă
- Kontra
- Opera in Romania
- Romania in the Eurovision Song Contest
- Vioara cu goarnă

== Bibliography ==
- Broughton, Simon. "Taraf Traditions". 2000. In Broughton, Simon and Ellingham, Mark with McConnachie, James and Duane, Orla (Ed.), World Music, Vol. 1: Africa, Europe and the Middle East, pp 237–247. Rough Guides Ltd, Penguin Books. ISBN 1-85828-636-0
- Pascu, George & Boţocan, Melania. "Carte de istorie a muzicii", Muzica contemporană, pp 547–625. Vasiliana '98 Publishing, 2011.
