= When the shepherd lost his sheep =

Archaic Romanian musical folk poem

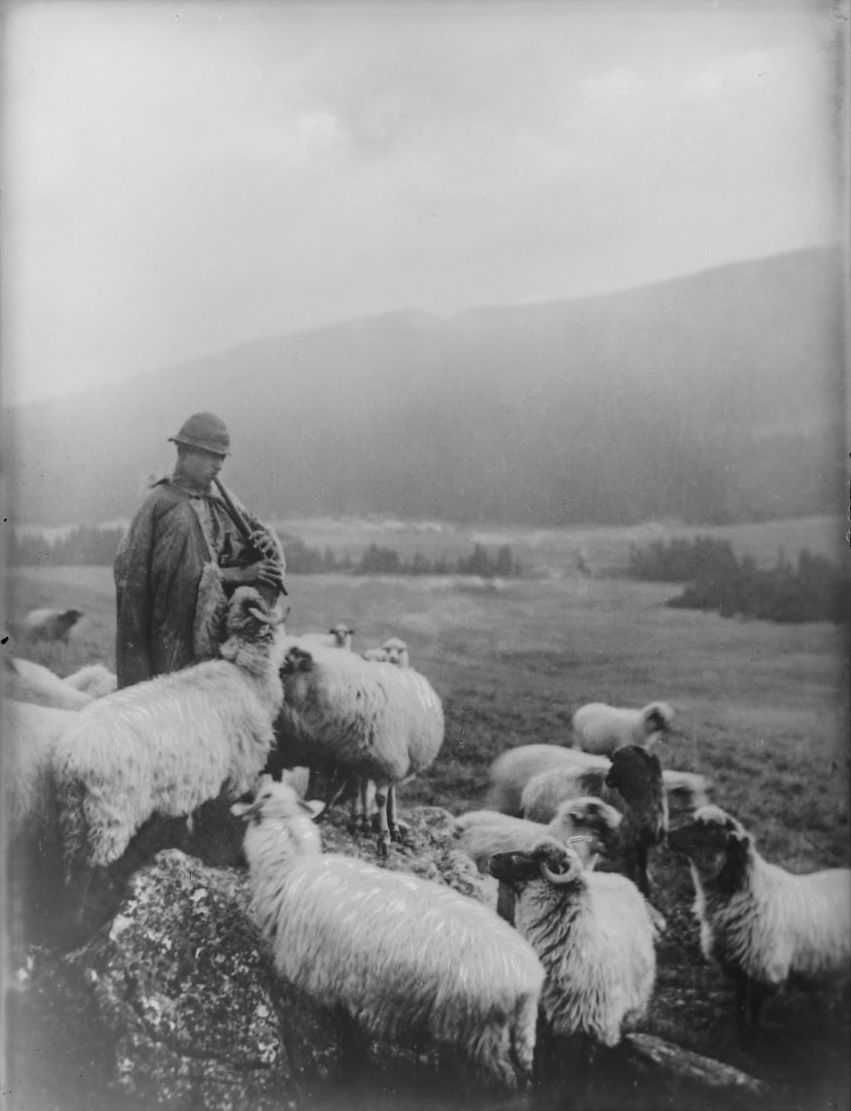
- Romanian shepherd with fluier and flock of sheep, 1930
- Original title: Romanian: Când și-a pierdut ciobanul oile
- Country: Romania; Moldova
- Language: Romanian
- Genre: Pastoral musical poem

"When the shepherd lost his sheep" (Romanian: Când și-a pierdut ciobanul oile) is an archaic musical folk poem rooted in pastoral and ritual traditions, widespread throughout the Romanian cultural area.

The piece tells the story of a shepherd who has lost his flock and sets out in search of it. Its musical structure is based on a contrast between two episodes: a slow, lyrical part (a doina), expressing the sorrow of loss, and a lively dance melody, symbolizing the joy of hope in finding the flock or, in some versions, its actual return.

The poem is usually performed solo, mainly by male shepherds, in a vocal-instrumental form. The primary instrument used is the fluier – a Romanian shepherd's flute regarded as a symbol of pastoral culture. Some variants include elements of heterophony, in which the flute's sound is combined with simultaneously produced guttural overtones.

Alongside the ballad "Miorița", the poem is considered an important element of Romanian folklore, reflecting the spiritual and musical-poetic structure of what is known as the Mioritic space – a symbolic landscape of the Romanian worldview according to philosopher Lucian Blaga.

Due to the decline of the traditional pastoral lifestyle, "When the shepherd lost his sheep" has largely disappeared from contemporary folk practice.

== Context ==
Romanian pastoral folklore includes a wide range of utilitarian melodies that accompany the daily life of shepherds. A significant role is played by signal tunes, performed on instruments such as the fluier or the bucium. These melodies mark different pastoral activities – for example, "Când mulge oile" (When the sheep are milked), "A cașului" (During the making of caș (Note: Caș is a young, unsalted cheese similar to Hutsul budz or Italian: tuma cheese.))… There are also melodies known as "road melodies" that accompany the seasonal movement of flocks between summer and winter pastures, such as "Pornirea" (The departure), "Când urcă oile la munte" (When the sheep go up the mountain). Other tunes serve to gather a scattered flock, including "Adunatul oilor la stână" (Gathering the sheep at the sheepfold), "Când adună oile de pe munte" (When gathering the sheep from the mountain).

Alongside utilitarian genres, the pastoral repertoire features more elaborate forms such as colinde (ritual carols), ballads, and dance melodies, all unified by the common theme of shepherding life.

The poem "When the shepherd lost his sheep" holds a distinct place at the intersection of these traditions. It combines narrative structure, musical expression, ritual significance, and dramatic progression – marking a shift from purely functional music to an artistic folk form.

== History ==
References to this archaic musical and poetic composition, associated with the Romanian pastoral tradition, date back to the 16th century. The Hungarian poet Bálint Balassi, in one of his poems, describes a song of a "Romanian shepherdess mourning her lost sheep".

Similar musical themes were noted in the 16th century in a description of the entourage of Mihnea III. Such music was also performed during the triumphal entry of Michael the Brave into Alba Iulia (1599).

The Romanian historian Gheorghe Șincai recounts a similar episode in his Chronicle of the Romanians, (Note: Hronica Românilor (1853) is one of the first books written in Romanian, describing the history of the Romanian people from ancient times to the 19th century.) mentioning that in 1659, "a musical piece was performed of a Romanian girl who had lost her goats and was searching for them tearfully in the mountains".

In 1846, the Moldavian writer Alecu Russo, while in exile at the Soveja Monastery, documented one of the earliest known narrative variants of the theme of a lost flock. During this time, he also recorded the text of the ballad "Miorița" for the first time.

== Field recordings and ethnographic research ==
"The shepherd mourns the loss of his sheep", fluier
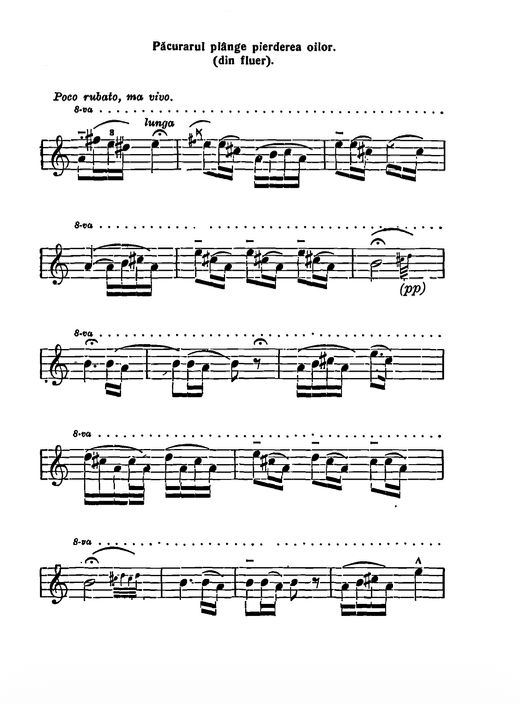
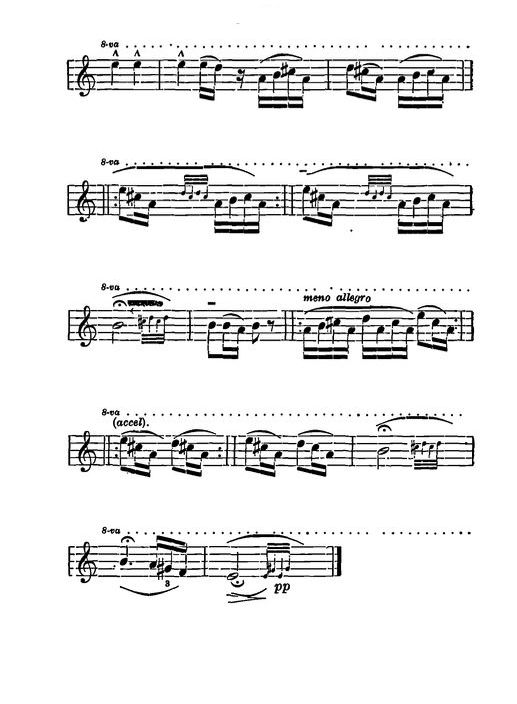
Transcription by Béla Bartók (Bihor, 1913)

In the early 20th century, the Hungarian composer and ethnographer Béla Bartók documented interest in the musical aspect of the poem:

I was played a doina on the violin and fluier called "When the shepherd lost his sheep". It is a melody performed slowly and in a free rhythm (rubato), which is sometimes extended by attaching another dance melody – "When he found them" – performed at a livelier tempo and with a clear meter. Songs of this kind are common in all the regions I have had the chance to visit and likely represent a Romanian specialty.

Bartók recorded and transcribed several versions of the piece in different regions of Romania.

In the 1930s, Romanian ethnomusicologist Constantin Brăiloiu documented several instrumental performances, such as:

- Când și-a pierdut ciobanul oile, performed on cimpoi and fluier by Ion Papuc (1932, Buzău County, Muntenia).
- Când și-a pierdut ciobanul oile, performed on fluier by Ilie Cazacu (1936, Suceava County, Bukovina).

Ilie Cazacu's version was later re-recorded in 1965, and in 1974 by his successor Silvestru Lungoci.

The Romanian-German ethnographer Gottfried Habenicht published transcriptions of field recordings of different types of the piece in the appendix to a 1968 article:

- The colinda "Horia caprelor" (1947; Maramureș), performed by Paul M. Roman;
- The instrumental piece A ciobanului când și-a pierdut oile (1960, Sibiu County, Transylvania), performed by Niculae Bratu).
- The lăutărească ballad Ciobanu când a chierdut oile (1961, Dolj County, Oltenia) performed on violin by Lache Găzaru, a renowned lăutar.

In northern Bukovina, Moldovan ethnographer Vasile Chiseliță recorded a version titled Doina oilor, performed on violin by Gheorghe Tochiță (Krasnoilsk).

In 1990, a double vinyl release by the Soviet Melodiya record label included a version of "When the shepherd lost his sheep" performed by Procopie Bogos (Buţeni, Moldova), on a piece of birch bark. (Note: In Romanian folklore, various pseudo-instruments are widely used, such as leaves, pieces of birch bark, and fish scales.) The recording was made by Moldovan ethnographers in 1986.

Another variant of the lăutărească ballad was recorded in 1994 by Speranța Rădulescu as part of the Ethnophonie project. The performance was given by a taraf from Dobrotești (Teleorman, Muntenia).

Among recent examples of authentic performance are televised appearances by Transylvanian shepherd Mihai Moldovan in 2016–2017, as well as a field recording of Maramureș shepherd Toader Ivanciuc (2024).

== Plot and interpretations ==
- Când și-a pierdut ciobanul oile
- Alexandru Găină (trișcă)
- Neculai Taftă (caval), 1956
- Silvestru Lungoci (fluier mare), 1974
- Ilie Cazacu (fluier), 1936
- Ilie Cazacu (fluier), 1965
- Ion Papuc (cimpoi, fluier, voice), 1932
- Aurel Amarandei (tilincă), 1981
- Procopie Bogos (birch bark), 1986
- Mihai Moldovan, 2016
- Taraful din Dobrotești, 1994
- Trei parale, 2015
- Toader Ivanciuc, 2024
- Михайло Тимофіїв, 1987
- Zágor Aladár "Pici", 1932

At the heart of the narrative is the figure of a shepherd who has lost his flock. Depending on the version, the sheep disappear mysteriously or are stolen. The shepherd believes he sees his flock in the distance, but hope proves illusory: he is deceived by white stones or swaying feather grass, mistaken for sheep.

The musical narrative reveals feelings of sorrow, solitude, introspection, and despair. The protagonist may engage in a symbolic dialogue with nature, animals, God, or with himself. Some variants introduce more explicit narrative elements: the shepherd sets out to search for the flock, experiences an internal struggle, and attempts to comprehend the cause of the loss. However, the ending is often unresolved – the sheep are not found, and the sense of tragedy remains.

Scholars analyzing these variants have highlighted several potential cultural and psychological functions of the poem. These include its expression of existential loss, its reflection of pastoral moral values such as care and responsibility, its connection to ritual or seasonal symbolism, and its use as a form of emotional self-expression.

=== Magical protection of the flock ===
Ethnographer Gottfried Habenicht connects the origins of the poem's narrative to the magico-religious foundation of traditional pastoral culture. He suggests a possible link between the story and ritual practices related to expulsion, purification, and seasonal transitions. In this context, the loss of a flock could be interpreted as a form of supernatural punishment for breaking pastoral taboos.

Pastoralism, as one of the oldest forms of subsistence, traditionally required not only practical skills but also spiritual safeguards. In traditional Romanian culture, the concept of ritual purity played a central role in ensuring the safety and fertility of livestock. The sheep is regarded as a sacred and ritually "pure" animal, (Note: For example, a Romanian proverb states: "The fluier and the sheep were given by God, while the violin and the goat were given by the devil." (Fluierul și oaia au fost date de Dumnezeu, pe când scripca și capra – de diavol).) and the shepherd was expected to meet certain moral and physical standards. Violations of purity included activities such as attending village dances or engaging in romantic relationships. According to these beliefs, such actions could disrupt the protective harmony and lead to the loss of the flock.

Various ritual practices were used to protect the animals, including fumigation, spoken incantations, directional bucium calls aimed at the four cardinal points, and the use of living fire. These acts reflected the need for divine or supernatural protection against harm.

A recurrent motif in pastoral belief is the perception of women as a potential source of disruption to the sacred order. Their presence on the pasture was believed to destroy the mana (spiritual power) of the flock, possibly causing infertility among sheep or other misfortunes. As a result, women were traditionally barred from entering sheepfolds, and shepherds were often bound by a vow of chastity. In a number of ballads, including "Miorița" and its regional variants, the motif of a female character breaking a taboo (e.g., the "major's daughter") (Note: Fata de maior. This may reflect another aspect of pastoral life: the opposition of the shepherd to the farmer — the word maior (variant: maier, from German: Meier) denotes a peasant farm, as well as a farmer among the Transylvanian Saxons.) is accompanied by a tragic outcome. These narratives reflect the symbolic importance of maintaining sacred boundaries within pastoral life.

The story of the lost sheep is interpreted as a moral allegory, illustrating the consequences of violating pastoral norms. Some versions explicitly state that the shepherd loses his flock after spending a night away from the sheepfold or visiting a lover. In other texts, a sheep refuses to obey after sensing the presence of a woman. A recurring image is that of the shepherd awakening to discover that both his flock and a mysterious girl have vanished. These narratives emphasize the direct link between norm violation and the disruption of pastoral order.

Over time, the plot loses its archaic symbolism and acquires a more secular character. Later versions attribute the disappearance of the flock to external causes: a storm, predators, or accidental negligence. The moral emphasis weakens, and elements of realism, everyday life, and narrative neutrality are strengthened. A comic tone appears, and the motif loses its connection to ritual. At the same time, the symbolic significance of the sheep as the center of the pastoral universe is preserved.

=== Similar musical stories ===
Pastoral folklore has given rise to other narrative musical tales. One of the best-known is "Povestea lui Tânjală" (The Story of Tânjală). In this tale, a shepherd descending from the mountains with his flock loses his fluier. Encountering a group of plowmen, he takes their tânjală (a wooden yoke bar used in harnesses) and carves a new instrument from it. The plowmen, considering this theft, bring him before a judge. After hearing the case, the judge asks the shepherd to play the fluier. Impressed by the shepherd's musical talent, the judge releases him. From that time on, the shepherd is known by the nickname Tânjală.

In some versions, the story continues: the frightened shepherd dares not descend into the valley and spends the winter on the mountain top, playing doinas and longing for his sheep.

== Distribution and cross-cultural parallels ==
The composition is widespread throughout the entire Romanian cultural area: in Moldavia, Muntenia, Oltenia, Maramureș, Transylvania, Banat, Bukovina, as well as in the historical Romanian communities in Transcarpathia and Transnistria. In oral tradition, the title of the piece varies by region and performer. Common variants include:

- "Doina ciobanului" (The shepherd's doina);
- "Doina păcurarului" (Note: Păcurar (obsolete and dialectal) – refers to a shepherd (from Latin: pecorarius), a term largely superseded by the synonym of Turkish origin, cioban.) (The herdsman's doina);
- "Jalea cârlanului" (The lamb's lament);
- "A oilor" ([The doina] of the sheep);
- "Ciobăneasca" (The shepherd's [tune]);
- "Doina mocanului" (The Mocani shepherd's doina).

Despite the variation in names, most versions preserve stable structural and expressive features, conveying the same core emotional and narrative motifs of the original epic form.

Musical and poetic compositions similar in form and meaning also exist in the pastoral tradition of the North Carpathian peoples, under names such as "Hungarian: Oláh leány tánca" (Dance of a Vlach girl), "Ukrainian: Як вівчар вівці загубив" (How the shepherd lost his sheep), "Ukrainian: Дума про вівчаря" (The lament of the shepherd), "Polish: Wołoszyn owce rozproszył" (The vlach lost sheep), and others. These parallels reflect the common structure of Carpathian pastoral culture, formed through inter-ethnic contacts, particularly during the migration of Romanian (Wallachian) (Note: The Principality of Wallachia (Romanian: Țara Românească, literally "the Romanian Country") united the historical regions of Muntenia and Oltenia from the XIV to the XIX centuries.) shepherd populations in the 13th and 14th centuries. Medieval chronicles note the spread of pastoral settlements established under Vlach law (Latin: jus valachicum) among Slavic populations in Central Europe – in Galicia, Slovakia, the Polish Podhale region, and the Moravian Wallachia. The ethnonym Vlach in these regions acquired the additional meaning of "shepherd".

== Musical forms ==
The musical forms of the composition range from concise vocal colinda to elaborate instrumental performances and even theatrical adaptations. Variants differ depending on region, context of performance, and the degree of narrative elaboration.

=== Vocal variants ===
Vocal interpretations include short songs, primarily colinde and hori, (Note: Romanian: Hore (pl. hori) is a Transylvanian regional term for doina, not to be confused with a dance hora.) common in northern Transylvania. These are usually constructed on a hexasyllabic (6-syllable) or octosyllabic (8-syllable) metrical pattern and performed in a dance-like rhythm. The melodic basis is the Dorian hexachord. These compositions are characterized by their brevity, emotional restraint, and an archetypal narrative scheme: irreversible loss (often of goats), a search, and a final note of regret. Content is presented schematically, with little or no plot development and restrained ornamentation. This vocal variant is considered to be the most ancient form of the work.

=== Instrumental forms ===
The instrumental version of the poem represents a more developed form that has become widespread in all regions of the Romanian cultural area, particularly in areas of traditional pastoralism. The musical narrative is structured around the alternation of contrasting emotional states: sorrow over the loss of the flock, and joy at its perceived recovery. These emotions are expressed in distinct musical sections:

- Sorrow (jale, J) is conveyed through a doina or a melody performed in a free, rubato rhythm;
- Joy (bucurie, B) is represented by a dance melody, typically in a regular, giusto rhythm.

This forms a typical three-part structure: J–B–J, in which the return to the sorrowful theme underscores the illusory nature of the joy (the supposed flock turns out to be only stones).

In later versions, the didactic component is reduced, and the alternation of emotional themes is interpreted as a self-contained musical expression. The poem thus takes on primarily aesthetic rather than moral significance. A four-part composition with a "happy ending" appears: J–B–J–B, where the final dance symbolizes the actual recovery of the flock.

The musical narrative is entirely built on instrumental means. It is most commonly performed on the fluier or Romanian caval, traditional shepherd's flutes that differ in size and timbre. Performers may switch instruments within a single performance to vary tone color and mood – for instance, beginning the narrative on a caval and concluding with a brighter-sounding fluier or even a tree leaf. In some performances, musicians produce simultaneous guttural overtones while playing the flute, creating a heterophonic texture with two closely related but distinct melodic lines.

The music is highly ornamented, employing a rich vocabulary of expressive techniques to convey the narrative's emotional range. Performers use dynamic shifts like crescendo and decrescendo to reflect the shepherd's inner states. Accents, often placed off-beat or against the main pulse, contribute to a distinctive expressive language that may evoke the shepherd's heavy footsteps or the insistence of his calls. Additional techniques include mordents, tremolos, legato, staccato, and dramatic pauses, all of which enhance the music's poetic character.

The rhythm is often rubato, free and unmeasured, particularly in sections expressing sorrow. This approach, akin to the doina genre, allows phrasing to follow speech-like intonation. In contrast, episodes that depict direct action are often set to a constant, fixed rhythm.

Melodically, the poem employs a variety of modal systems. The Dorian mode is commonly used for its somber character, though performers may modify individual scale degrees to reflect emotional shifts. The Aeolian mode and pentatonic scales often appear in the concluding dance sections, lending them a brighter tone.

Improvisation plays an important role: although the piece follows recognizable intonational models, each performance reflects the musician's personal interpretation.

=== Extended narrative versions ===
In some cases, the basic structure of the poem is supplemented with original narrative episodes. A prime example of this can be found in the interpretations of Nicolae Taftă. Nicolae Taftă, a priest and caval performer from Negrilești (Vrancea region, Moldova), performed highly elaborate versions, sometimes including up to 15 distinct episodes. These combine musical material with realistic storytelling, symbolic references to nature, and verbal narration. Such works go beyond a purely musical form and take on the features of an oral epic.

=== Ballad in lăutărească style ===
Professional musicians (lăutari) have adapted the theme into an ironic ballad. In these versions, the loss of the flock is portrayed humorously: the shepherd is often shown as lazy or lovestruck, neglecting his duties. Other motifs include the miraculous recovery of the flock (with the number of sheep mysteriously doubled) and dialogues with a wolf. Structurally, these ballads resemble the rondo form: verses alternate with refrains. The characters are exaggerated or caricatured, and the performance is meant primarily for entertainment, belonging to the tradition of festive or table folklore. These versions represent parodic reinterpretations of archaic, more solemn models.

=== Theatrical and dramatic forms ===
In some regions, the plot of the poem evolved into forms of traditional folk theatre. These performances feature characters, dialogues, and dramatic action, while preserving the musical foundation of the work. Examples of such stagings have been documented in Dobruja (the play "Mocanii") and in Vâlcea County (Oltenia).

== Musical influences ==
=== Instrumental pieces in lăutărească music ===
Peasant and pastoral traditional music is the primary source of lăutărească music. The poem "When the shepherd lost his sheep" not only entered the lăutari repertoire as a vocal ballad, but also influenced the development of instrumental genres. Its narrative is reflected in the dichotomous structure of a widespread type of lăutari composition, built on the alternation of two musical episodes: a doina, expressing the sorrow of loss, and a dance melody, symbolizing joy. This compositional model gave rise to a whole series of instrumental pieces designed for aesthetic enjoyment, such as "Doina ciobanului" (The Shepherd's Doina), "Doina și hora", "Doina și bătuta", "Doina și brâul", "Doina și sârba", and others.

=== Connection with the ballad of Pintea the Brave ===
The Romanian ethnomusicologist Constantin Prichici has shown that the musical foundation of the ballad about Pintea the Brave, a legendary haiduc from Maramureș, can be traced back to archaic pastoral folklore, and primarily to the poem "When the shepherd lost his sheep".

Both works share key musical characteristics: an alternation between slow and lively sections (a J–B–J structure), the use of pastoral signaling intonations, and improvisation techniques. They also feature typical intervallic patterns, the fourth and the fifth, characteristic of performance on the fluier, caval, and bucium.

== "Miorița" and "When the shepherd lost his sheep" ==
The most well-known work of Romanian pastoral folklore is the ballad "Miorița". It shares with the poem "When the shepherd lost his sheep" a pastoral context, the motif of loss, and the symbolism of the sheep as a sacred being. At the same time, there are significant differences between them in both structure and worldview.

"Miorița" is most often performed in a narrative form, with emphasis on text and symbolism rather than musical dramaturgy. The shepherd anticipates his own death, foretold by a little ewe. Rather than resisting, he accepts his fate as a natural transition, filling it with poetic images (a cosmic wedding, Mother Nature, and spiritual ascension). This has led some researchers to speak of Mioritic fatalism: a contemplative and harmonious attitude toward the inevitable (see Mircea Eliade's analysis). Constantin Brăiloiu argued that the poem does not express resignation before death but rather echoes ancient magical rites intended to protect the living from the dead.

"When the shepherd lost his sheep" has a broader emotional range and a more open structure. It is built on musical contrasts: sorrow – illusory hope – disappointment – possible joy. The shepherd is not passive; he searches for the flock, enters into a dialogue with nature, and undergoes an internal emotional journey. In this case, fate is not a serene inevitability, but a lived experience of loss and search, even to the point of doubt and disorientation.

== Modern status ==
Today, the musical folk poem "When the shepherd lost his sheep" has largely disappeared from living tradition. Its decline is linked to profound transformations in rural life, including the mechanization of agriculture, collectivization, the disappearance of communal pastures, and the erosion of traditional lifestyles. The situation has been exacerbated by broader social and economic changes that have led to the disintegration of peasant communities – the primary bearers of oral tradition. The influence of globalization has also reduced the space for the performance and transmission of pastoral folklore in its original form.

In 2015, the Romanian traditional music group Trei Parale released an album titled Ciobanul care și-a pierdut oile, featuring their modern rendition of the poem.

== Sources ==
- Russo, Alecu (1846). Soveja. Ziarul unui exilat politic la 1846 [Soveja. Journal of a Political Exile in 1846] (in Romanian).
- Bartók, Béla (1913). Cântece poporale româneşti din comitatul Bihor (Ungaria) [Romanian folk songs from Bihor County (Hungary)] (in Romanian). Bucureşti: Socec & comp. şi C. Sfetea.
- Blaga, Lucian (1936). Spaţiul mioritic [Mioritic space] (in Romanian). București: Cartea românească.
- Brăiloiu, Constantin (1946). Sur une ballade roumaine (La Mioritza) [On one Romanian ballad (Mioritza)] (in French). Genève: Kundig.
- Alexandru, Tiberiu (1956). Instrumentele muzicale ale poporului romîn [Musical instruments of the Romanian people] (in Romanian). Bucureşti: Editura de stat pentru literatură şi artă.
- Prichici, Constantin (1957). "Geneza melodică a baladei lui Pintea Viteazul" [The melodic genesis of the ballad of Pintea the Brave]. Revista de etnografie şi folclor (in Romanian). 2 (4): 7–26.
- Махновец, Л. Є., ed. (1959). Давній український гумор і сатира [Old Ukrainian humor and satire] (in Ukrainian). Київ: Держ. вид-во худож. літ.
- Bartók, Béla (1967). Suchoff, Benjamin (ed.). Rumanian Folk Music. Vol. 1. Instrumental Melodies. The Hague: Martinus Nijhoff. doi:10.1007/978-94-010-3499-9. ISBN 978-94-010-3501-9.
- Suliţeanu, Ghizela (1967). "Poemul popular "Când şi-a pierdut ciobanul oile" (Studiu asupra unei variante din Negrileşti – Vrancea)" [The folk poem "When the shepherd lost his sheep" (Study on a variant from Negrileşti – Vrancea)]. Revista de etnografie şi folclor (in Romanian). 12 (6): 435–460.
- Habenicht, Gottfried (1968). "Povestea ciobanului care şi-a pierdut oile. Geneză, evoluţie, tipuri" [The story of the shepherd who lost his sheep. Genesis, evolution, types]. Revista de etnografie şi folclor (in Romanian). 13 (3): 235–250.
- Eliade, Mircea (1972). Zalmoxis. The Vanishing God. Chicago: The University of Chicago Press. ISBN 0-226-20398-0.
- Bartók, Béla (1975). Suchoff, Benjamin (ed.). Rumanian Folk Music. Vol. 5. Maramureș County. The Hague: Martinus Nijhoff. doi:10.1007/978-94-010-1686-5. ISBN 978-94-010-1688-9.
- Alexandru, Tiberiu (1980). "Pastoral Music". Romanian Folk Music. Bucharest: Musical Publishing House.
- Chiseliţă, Vasile (1993). "Instrumentele muzicale şi muzica instrumentală în nordul Bucovinei" [Musical instruments and instrumental music in northern Bukovina]. Folclor din Ţara Fagilor (in Romanian). Chişinău: Hyperion: 511–559. ISBN 5-368-01787-1.
- Rădulescu, Speranța (1996). "Gypsy Music versus the Music of Others" (PDF). Martor. 1. București: The Museum of the Romanian Peasant Anthropology: 134–145.
- Chiseliţă, Vasile (2009). "Repertoriul muzical păstoresc" [Pastoral musical repertoire]. Arta muzicală a Moldovei. Istorie și modernitate (in Romanian). Chişinău: Grafema Libris: 235–272. ISBN 978-9975-52-046-1.
- Nechiforeac, Vasilisa; Teodor, Svetlana; Scorpan, Irina, eds. (2009). Gleb Ciaicovschi-Mereşanu (1919—1999). Biobibliografie (in Romanian). Chişinău: Academia de Muzică, Teatru şi Arte Plastice. ISBN 978-9975-9634-9-7.
- Guta, Armand (2015). "From Ius Valachicum to the Vlach folkloric influences within Central Europe". Balcanica Posnaniensia. Acta et studia. 22 (1): 71–81. doi:10.14746/bp.2015.22.6.

=== Web links ===
- Papuc, Ion (1932). "Cînd si-a perdut ciobanul oile" [When the shepherd lost his sheep]. Fonds Constantin Brailoiu (in Romanian). Archived from the original on 2025-06-12.
- Cazacu, Ilie (1936). "The Traditional Folk Music Band: II. Bucovina". discogs.com. Archived from the original on 2025-06-27.
- Lungoci, Silvestru (1974). "Bucovine II (Coutumes)". discogs.com. Archived from the original on 2025-06-27.
- Bogos, Procopie (1990a). "Молдавский музыкальный фольклор" [Moldavian musical folklore]. melody.su (in Russian). Melodiya. Archived from the original on 2025-06-24.
- Bogos, Procopie (1990b). "Moldavian Musical Folklore". discogs.com. Archived from the original on 2025-06-27.
- Taraful din Dobrotești (1994). "Ciobanul care și-a pierdut oile" [The shepherd who lost his sheep]. YouTube (in Romanian). Ethnophonie.
- Тимофіїв, Михайло (1997). "Музичні інструменти Гуцульщини" [Musical instruments of the Hutsul region]. discogs.com (in Ukrainian). Українська Експериментальна Лабораторія Фольклору. Archived from the original on 2025-07-03.
- Fonó Budai Zeneház (2003). "When the Shepherd Lost His Sheep". fono.hu. Archived from the original on 2025-07-03.
- Chiseliţă, Vasile (2011). "Când şi-a pierdut ciobanul oile" [When the shepherd lost his sheep]. Patrimoniul cultural imaterial al Republicii Moldova (in Romanian). Ministerul Culturii al Republicii Moldova. Archived from the original on 2024-11-04.
- Trei parale (2015). "Ciobanul care și-a pierdut oile" [The shepherd who lost his sheep]. bandcamp.com. Archived from the original on 2025-06-27.
- Moldovan, Mihai (2017). "Mihai Moldovan, baciul din Mureş, calificat în semifinala "Vedeta populară"" [Mihai Moldovan, the shepherd from Mureş, qualified for the "Popular Star" semi-final]. tvr.ro (in Romanian). Televiziunea Română. Archived from the original on 2025-06-27.
- Bartók, Béla (2016–2021). "Collections at the Museum of Ethnography. Romanian units". bartok.neprajz.hu. Museum of Ethnography. Archived from the original on 2025-04-27.
- Ivanciuc, Toader (2024). "Peste 40 ani de ciobǎnie – Valea Muntelui. Cântece la fluier și trâmbițǎ cu Ion și Toader Ivanciuc" [Over 40 years of shepherding – Valea Muntelui. Songs on the fluier and trâmbițǎ with Ion and Toader Ivanciuc]. YouTube (in Romanian).
