= Hăulit =

Romanian yodel-like folk vocal genre

- Native name: Romanian: hăulit
- Other names: ăulit, aguguit, huhurezat

Fusion genres
- Fifă playing

Regional scenes
- Romania

Local scenes
- Oltenia

Hăulit (Romanian pronunciation [hə.uˈlit]) is a vocal genre of Romanian folklore, found mainly in Oltenia, in the southern and eastern foothills of the Carpathians. Various names are found in folk speech, including ăulit, aguguit, and huhurezat.

Hăulit is characterized by an abrupt switch between the chest voice and falsetto, which relates it to the Alpine yodel and allows it to be considered its Romanian equivalent. Historically, it served as a means of sound signaling over long distances, primarily in pastoral environments, and was also used to express emotions, such as the joy of the arrival of spring.

As a rule, hăulit is based on the archaic natural harmonic series and is performed in a free rhythm (rubato). In modern tradition, it is found both as a standalone form (especially in children's folklore) and as characteristic vocal insertions in other genres, such as the doina or folk song.

== Origin and history of study ==
- Hăulit
- Ioana Catuta – Hăulit (1933–1943)
- Cristina Gh. Pavel – Doină cu hăulit: „Ferice, codre, de tine” (Gorj, Oltenia, 1940)
- Maria Lătărețu – Hăulita din Gorj (1960)

The music critic and ethnomusicologist George Breazul, who studied hăulit from the 1930s, defined it as an ancient spring custom of calls with drawn-out shouts, performed by children and later by adults. These calls resembled the simplest sounds produced by a vibrating air column and were similar in character to the playing of primitive wind instruments.

The ethnomusicologist Corneliu Georgescu considers the most probable hypothesis to be that hăulit originated as a vocal technique but was influenced in its development by pastoral wind instruments with a natural scale (such as the bucium), which shaped its unique "chordal melodic structure" (melodică acordică). Although no direct evidence of a magical function for hăulit has been found in Romanian culture, its origin, like that of the Alpine yodel, may be linked to ancient magical practices where unusual vocal techniques (falsetto, register shifts) were used in rituals. Georgescu called hăulit "a living relic of a prehistoric musical civilization."

Constantin Brăiloiu recorded hăulit during his field expeditions in Gorj County between 1933 and 1943, documenting it both as a standalone genre and as an element of the doina.

== Functions and social context ==
Hăulit is closely linked to pastoral culture. Archival records confirm its use by children and girls who herded cows or goats to call to one another across hills. Girls also used hăulit as a signal for boys. Today, the genre is in decline, surviving mainly in the repertoire of children. The most valuable and authentic recordings were made from elderly women, which suggests the tradition's transition into the children's sphere as it faded from adult culture.

A striking example of the fusion of vocal and instrumental practice is the playing of the fifa – a primitive, unitonal fluier whose area of distribution coincides with the limited zone where hăulit is practiced in Oltenia. Traditionally, this instrument was played by young unmarried girls, who alternated instrumental sounds with vocal calls in the hăulit technique. This performance served a communicative function, acting as a signal for communication between young men and women in the pastures. This unique tradition lies on the boundary between vocal and instrumental music, where the fifa creates a pulsating rhythmic foundation and the hăulit provides the improvisational melodic line.

Georgescu distinguished two varieties of hăulit: the chiot (a piercing, loud, and prolonged cry of joy, merriment, or a call) – an exclamation on the border between speech and music that does not use a clearly defined scale – and hăulit proper, a standalone musical genre. Both varieties can exist independently or as part of other genres, such as the doina or song. In the first case, they are performed by children and adults as a call, a signal over a distance, or an expression of joy at the arrival of spring; in the second, they appear at the end of a stanza or in certain sections ("elastic stanzas" (Note: In Romanian ethnomusicology, the term "elastic stanzas" (strofe elastice) refers to a flexible, rather than fixed, strophic structure in folk songs. An elastic stanza allows for variation in the number of lines and musical formulas, as well as the insertion of calls, hăulit, and interjections.)).

== Musical characteristics ==
In its features, hăulit is close to yodeling and usually has a free two-part form. The first part consists of the free repetition and variation of a single musical motif, performed with the characteristic rapid switching of vocal registers (chest and falsetto). The second part (which may be absent) is a climax consisting of a long falsetto note, followed by a release in the form of a descending glissando and a shout.

The melody of hăulit is unique in that it is often based not on familiar tempered scales but on the natural harmonic series, using overtones 3, 4, 5 or 4, 5, 6. Georgescu calls this "chordal melodic structure" (melodică acordică). At the same time, there are also hăulits built on pre-pentatonic scales more typical of Oltenia, which indicates a mutual influence between the two systems.

Hăulit is characterized not only by the switch between the chest register and falsetto but also by the use of special syllables to emphasize these transitions, for example: ă-u, ngă-u-ă, ă-lă-u. (Note: In phonetic transcription: [ə‿u], [ŋə‿u‿ə], [ə‿lə‿u].) Usually, the vowel [u] corresponds to sounds in the chest register, while [ə] (as in the Romanian: ă) or other open vowels correspond to sounds in falsetto.

Hăulit is performed in a free rhythm, based on simple metrical formulas – variations of the anapest and pyrrhic. These basic rhythms are usually hidden under ornamental formulas that vary and enrich them.

== Distribution and current status ==
While the area of "pure" hăulit is now limited to sub-Carpathian Oltenia, functionally similar but structurally different calls (chiots) are preserved in other regions, such as Argeș, Mureș, and Cluj. They are performed by representatives of different generations and both sexes, remaining predominantly associated with pastoral traditions. In some cases, these calls are also associated with spring fieldwork.

In Oltenia, the area of hăulit coincides with the distribution area of the doină cu noduri ("doina with knots") – another archaic singing technique.

Today, authentic hăulit is on the verge of extinction. However, its elements and formulas have penetrated most genres of Oltenian folklore, especially dance songs (cîntec de joc), which are its most vibrant form today.

== See also ==
- Bucium
- Doina
- Fifă

== Sources ==
- Breazul, George (1941). Patrium carmen. Contribuții la studiul muzicii românești [Patrium carmen. Contributions to the study of Romanian music] (in Romanian). Craiova: Editura Scrisul Romanesc.
- Herțea, Iosif (1964). "Șuerașul din cucută" [Hemlock whistle]. Revista de etnografie și folclor. 9 (4–5): 503–508.
- Georgescu, Corneliu (1966). "Hăulitul din Oltenia subcarpatică" [The Haulit from Subcarpathian Oltenia]. Revista de etnografie și folclor (in Romanian). 11 (4): 371–385.
- Alexandru, Tiberiu (1975). Muzica populară românească [Romanian Folk Music] (in Romanian). București: Editura Muzicală.
- Firca, Gheorghe, ed. (2010). Dicționar de termeni muzicali [Dictionary of musical terms] (in Romanian). București: Editura Enciclopedică. ISBN 978-973-45-0606-4.
- Libin, Laurence, ed. (2014). The Grove Dictionary of Musical Instruments. Vol. 2 (Daadua – Hymn Technology Ltd) (2 ed.). New York: Oxford University Press. ISBN 978-0-19-935030-8.

== External sources ==
- "Fifăi". dexonline.ro (in Romanian). Archived from the original on 2021-12-07.
- discogs.com (1988). "Roumanie: Musique De Villages. Olténie". Archived from the original on 2025-09-01.
