= Fifă =

Type of Romanian folk flute

Fifa
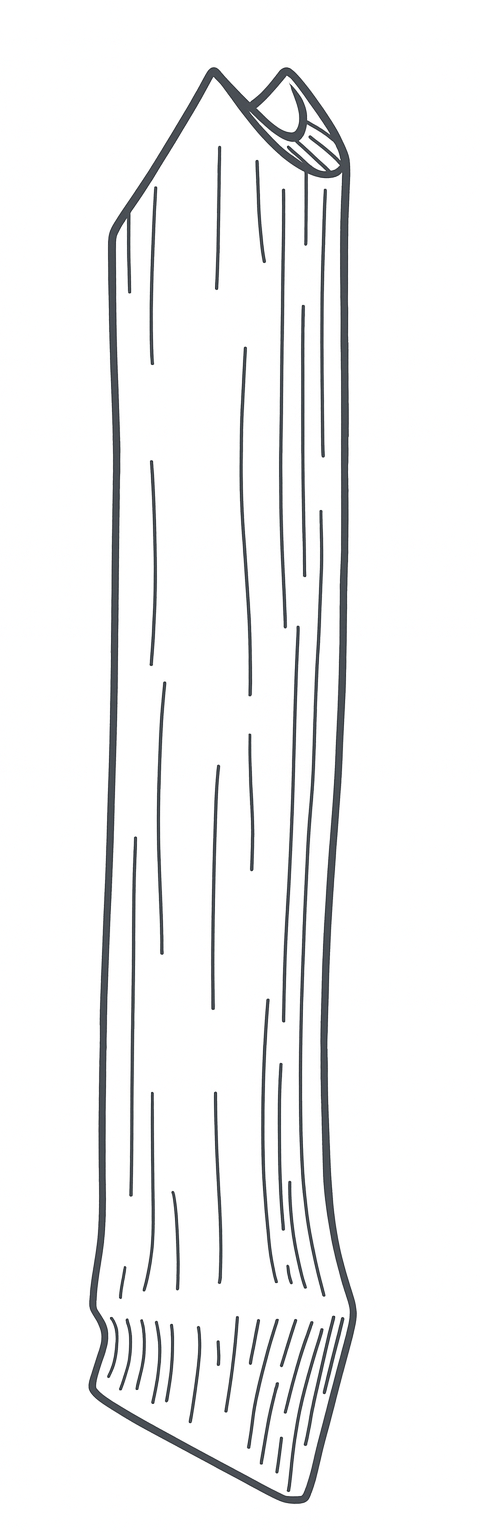
- Other names: dudină, șuieraș
- Classification: Aerophone
- Hornbostel–Sachs classification: 421.111.21 (Longitudinal stopped flute without finger holes.)

Related instruments
- Fluier (family), dudureiș, kugikly, kuvytsi, skudučiai

The fifa (Romanian: fifă; also: dudină, șuieraș) is a Romanian folk wind instrument, a type of fluier, found in specific areas in the foothills of the Carpathians in northern Oltenia. It is an archaic end-blown flute without finger holes, closed at the lower end, which produces a single, constant tone.

The key feature of the fifa is the combination of its instrumental sound with vocal improvisation: its constant tone serves as a sonic support, over which the performer – traditionally a young, unmarried woman – sings an improvised melody using the hăulit (guttural falsetto) technique, which resembles yodeling.

In ethnomusicology, the fifa is classified as an instrument that combines vocal and instrumental practice in equal measure. Its music is built on the steps of the natural harmonic series and is characterized by asymmetrical rhythms.

Typologically, the fifa is close to other flutes without finger holes (such as the tilinca), and by its construction (a stopped tube), it is similar to the individual pipes of pan-flutes (like the nai).

== Classification and cultural context ==
The fifa is part of the extensive family of traditional Romanian pastoral flutes, known by the general name fluier. This instrument is considered autochthonous to the Romanian cultural space and is deeply rooted in pastoral culture. In folk consciousness, the fluier was imbued with magical properties and, according to legends, had a divine origin.

The fluier family includes nearly twenty varieties, which differ in construction (single and double, with or without a fipple), materials, and the presence of finger holes. In this complex typology, the fifa holds a special place, representing one of the most archaic types: it is a stopped end-blown fluier without finger holes.

Although the fifa is an extremely simple instrument, its belonging to the fluier family places it in a broad cultural context. It shares the ritual, signaling, and communicative functions historically inherent to pastoral wind instruments and is living evidence of the early stages of development of vocal-instrumental music in the Carpathian region.

The instrument was discovered and described by researchers relatively late, in the 1960s, in the Carpathian foothills of northern Oltenia.

== History of study ==
The instrument was first scientifically described in 1964 by the Romanian ethnomusicologist Iosif Herțea under the name "hemlock whistle" (Romanian: șuieraș de cucută). Later, in 1975, the instrument was included in Tiberiu Alexandru's fundamental work on Romanian folk music under its folk name, "fifa". In 1999, ethnomusicologist Viorica Tătulea described the fifa in a survey of traditional musical instruments in Oltenia.

Additionally, the fifa and its performers were featured in the 1976 Romanian documentary film Cântecul pământului (Song of the Earth), in which the ethnomusicologist Harry Brauner participated.

== Etymology and folklore context ==
The instrument's names and the material for its construction are closely linked to Romanian folklore. While the main name "fifa" is likely onomatopoeic (Note: The verb a fifăi (dialectal, archaic) means "to make sounds like a gosling's peep".(dexonline.ro)), the alternative name dudină, as well as dialectal names for hemlock itself (buciniş, bucen, dudău, dudoi), have deep etymological connections to other folk wind instruments: buciniş and bucen are variants of the name for the pastoral horn bucium; in turn, dudău and dudoi are local names for a horn. Furthermore, duda in Hungarian and some Slavic languages also denotes a wind instrument, usually a bagpipe (see e.g. duda). A Romanian children's folklore rhyme has been preserved in which a child is asked to make a dudină (fifa) from buciniş (hemlock).

This connection is also recorded in Classical Latin, where the word cicuta (hemlock) meant both "poison" and "a pipe made of a hemlock stalk".

== Construction ==
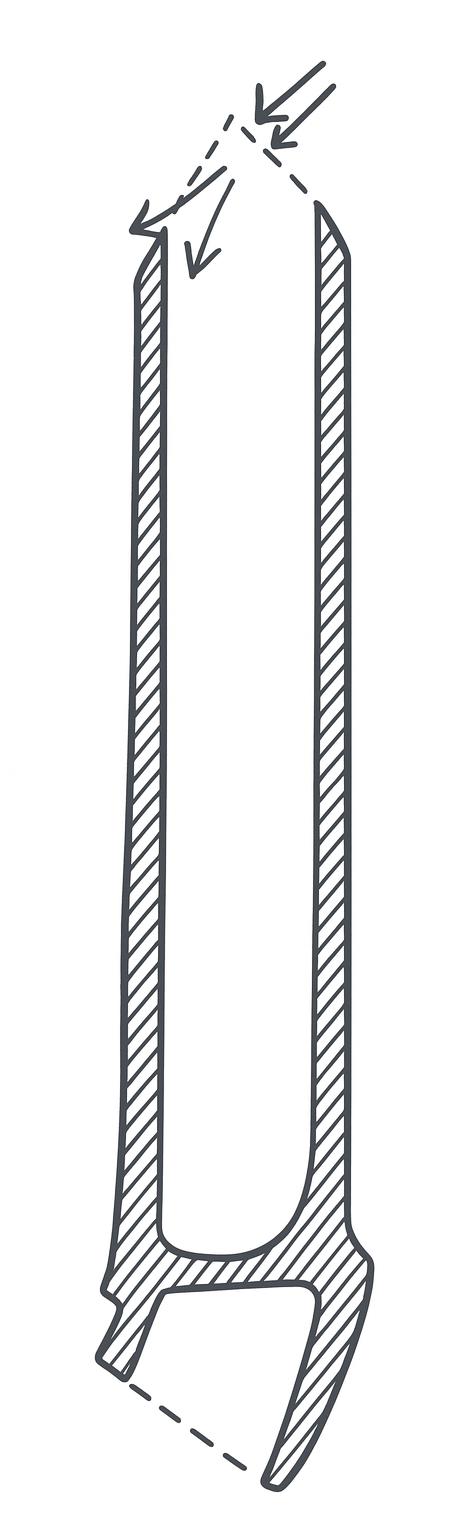
Fifa

The fifa is the simplest type of fluier. Unlike most Romanian fluiere equipped with finger holes, the fifa (like the tilinca) lacks them. Organologically, the fifa can be considered an archaic form or "phase" in the development of the tilinca, which, unlike the fifa, is a tube open at both ends.

The instrument is made from the lignified cylindrical stalks of umbelliferous plants (hemlock, lovage) or elder, and more rarely, reed. Sometimes the instrument was made from pumpkin stalks, but such examples were not durable. Regardless of the material, before playing, the fifa had to be thoroughly soaked in water to ensure the complete uniformity of its walls and a proper sound.

The instrument is a tube 8–20 cm long with an internal diameter of 1–2 cm. The lower end of the tube is closed by a natural node of the stalk. The fifa's embouchure (mouthpiece) is an intermediate type between that of a tilinca (an open flute without holes) and a fipple flute (recorder). The opening is formed not by one, but by two cuts: the upper end of the tube is cut diagonally into two uneven bevels located opposite each other. This asymmetry of the cuts creates two different lengths of the vibrating air column (acoustically analogous to having a side hole), making the instrument potentially two-toned. The performer's lips rest on one bevel, directing the stream of air onto the sharper edge of the opposite bevel, which splits the air stream and causes vibration.

This unique double-cut mouthpiece is extremely rare in global practice. Herțea noted in 1964 that the only similar analog he could find was a flute of the African N'Gapu people.

== Playing technique and musical features ==
The playing technique of the fifa is based on a close interaction between the instrument and the voice. Although the embouchure's construction acoustically allows for two different tones to be produced, in musical practice, performers use only one of them. This single, stable tone of the fifa serves as a pulsating instrumental support, over which a melody is vocally improvised using the hăulit technique – an archaic, guttural falsetto singing, close in sound to yodeling.

The fifa is most often played solo, but "call-and-response" performances in pairs are also known.

The music of the fifa has a free, improvisational structure, yet it is limited in its musical means. It is built on short, similar melodic-rhythmic cells based on just a few notes. In this technique, the voice essentially becomes an extension of the instrument, compensating for its minimal resources. Together, they create a zigzag contour of a single melodic line.

Recordings of performers from different localities show that, despite improvisation, this music has a surprisingly similar (homogeneous) character. Ethnomusicologists, notably Marius Schneider, define this style as "fanfare-type melody" (German: Fanfarenmelodik). This term describes archaic melodies built not on familiar scales, but on the steps of the natural (overtone) harmonic series. Just as a fanfare (a natural trumpet) can only produce its fundamental tone and its harmonics, the melody of the fifa is also built on the steps of this natural series. The voice (in the hăulit technique) sings wide leaps (fifths, fourths) over the single fundamental tone of the instrument itself.

This technique creates a strong contrast: the vocal part sounds "smooth" or "gliding," its pitch not being strictly fixed. The fifa's tone, in contrast, provides a precise and stable sonic reference. This combination of a "floating" voice and an instrumental "benchmark" is the characteristic feature of this archaic musical style.

Rhythmically, the music is built on short, asymmetrical, catalectic musical phrases. At the core of these phrases are only two durations – eighths and quarters. Iosif Herțea's research identified two types of such phrases, each with a total duration of eight eighth notes: series "A" (a combination of eighths) and series "B" (a combination of eighths with quarters). These phrases, in turn, are combined into asymmetrical strophes, such as AB-BB or BBB. Constantin Brăiloiu called this autonomous rhythmic system "children's rhythm", as it is widespread in children's folklore. However, as Brăiloiu noted, this system is not exclusively for children: it has archaic ritual roots and is found in the ritual and work songs of adults among various peoples of the world.

The fifa is the only Romanian folk instrument in which the vocal and instrumental elements are of equal importance.

== Functions ==
In the spring, when girls returned from pasture or went to field work, they would sing, calling to each other from different ends of the village, and accompany their vocal calls and hăulit with the fifa. The sounds of the fifa traditionally served a communicative function: they were used for signaling, invitations, or expressing feelings of love.

Researchers suggest that the instrument may also have been used for magical-utilitarian purposes. In Romanian beliefs, the shade of hemlock is considered a favorite habitat for snakes. At the same time, incantations against snakes often mention the bucin, an instrument etymologically linked to the hemlock plant. It is probable that in the past, shepherds may have used the sharp sound of the hemlock whistle to drive venomous snakes away from livestock.

The living tradition of fifa playing is preserved in certain villages of Oltenia, particularly in the counties of Mehedinți (villages of Scorniceaua, Grozești) and Gorj.

== Similar instruments and performance techniques ==
External videos
- Fifa and related instruments (sound samples)
- Fifa (Gorj, 1976)
- Dudurejš (Homolje, Serbia)
- Kugikly (Kursk Oblast, Russia)
- Kuima chipsan (Komi)
- Skudučiai (Lithuania)
- Hindewhu Central Africa

Serbian ethnographers have described the playing of Vlach shepherdesses from the Homolje region on monotonal flutes called in Serbian dudurejš. The instrument consists of two cylindrical tubes of different lengths, made from hemlock and open only at one end. The dudurejš can produce only two tones. Traditionally, this instrument was played only by women. During a performance, they would stand facing each other and lightly press the tubes against their lower lip. They would perform a characteristic signal melody, accompanying it with a peculiar falsetto. It was believed that if the dudurejš sounded harmonious, it could attract the attention of young men. This practice was common from May to July in many shepherd communities of Homolje.

Another typologically similar instrument is the hindewhu from the Central African Republic. This name is not the name of an instrument, but rather an onomatopoeia used by BaBenzélé pygmies to denote the technique of alternating voice with a single-pitch papaya stem whistle. The instrument itself is a tube, closed by a natural membrane at the node of the stalk, and emits only one sound. The hindewhu performance technique is analogous to the fifa, representing a "fusion between vocal and instrumental art". The music is built on the continuous alternation of the whistle sound, which, having an unchanging pitch, constitutes the "inevitable melodic axis" around which the melody gravitates. (Note: In Western music, the hindewhu became widely known in 1973 following the release of the album Headhunters by jazz pianist Herbie Hancock. For the remake of the composition "Watermelon Man" (1973), the band's percussionist, Bill Summers, imitated the hindewhu sound by blowing into a beer bottle. This sound was copied from the 1966 ethnomusicological recording The Music of the Ba-Benzélé Pygmies.)

Herțea pointed to the morphological kinship of the fifa (as a single-note, stopped tube) with the individual pipes of a nai (Romanian pan-flute). This same type of instrument includes the Lithuanian skudučiai, the Komi kuima chipsan, the Russian kugikly, and the Ukrainian kuvytsi. The pipes of the skudučiai, like the fifa, have an asymmetrical double-cut mouthpiece.

The strongest connection is evident in the archaic performance technique that combines the instrument and the voice. Playing the kugikly and kuvytsi, like the fifa, can be accompanied by vocal exclamations. Notably, shouting "fif-kaf" while playing the kugikly is called fifkanie ("fif-ing"). Lithuanian researchers note indirect evidence that skudučiai playing was similarly accompanied by vocal elements in the past.

== See also ==
- Hăulit
- Hindewhu

== Sources ==
- Brăiloiu, Constantin (1956). "Le Rythme enfantin: notions liminaires" [Children's Rhythm: Preliminary Notions]. Les Colloques de Wégimont (Premier colloque, 1954) (in German). Paris–Bruxelles: 64–96.
- Alexandru, Tiberiu (1956). Instrumentele muzicale ale poporului romîn [The musical instruments of the Romanian people] (in Romanian). București: Editura de stat pentru literatură şi artă.
- Herțea, Iosif (1964). "Șuerașul din cucută" [Hemlock whistle]. Revista de etnografie și folclor (in Romanian). 9 (4–5): 503–508.
- Dević, Dragoslav (1974). "Dudurejš – Eintonflöten aus dem Homolje" [Dudurejš – single-tone flutes from the Homolje]. Studia instrumentorum musicae popularis III. Festschrift to Ernst Emsheimer (in German). Stockholm: Nordiska Musikförlaget: 42–43.
- Alexandru, Tiberiu (1975). Muzica populară românească [Romanian Folk Music] (in Romanian). București: Editura Muzicală.
- Херцеа, Иосиф (1988). "Феномен на грани вокального и инструментального («фифа» — вид румынской флейты)" [A phenomenon on the border between vocal and instrumental (the "fifa" – a type of Romanian flute)]. Народные Музыкальные Инструменты И Инструментальная Музыка (in Russian). Москва: Советский композитор: 217–219.
- Feld, Steven (1996). "Pygmy POP. A Genealogy of Schizophonic Mimesis". Yearbook for Traditional Music. 28: 1–35. doi:10.2307/767805. JSTOR 767805.
- Tătulea, Viorica (1999). "Instrumente muzicale tradiţionale în Oltenia" [Traditional musical instruments in Oltenia]. Oltenia. Studii și comunicări. IX Seria etnografie (in Romanian). Craiova: Editura Aius: 32–62. ISBN 973-9251-58-7.
- Sadie, Stanley; Tyrrell, John, eds. (2001). The New Grove Dictionary of Music and Musicians (2 ed.). New York: Macmillan Publishers Limited. ISBN 0-333-60800-3.
- Šimonytė-Žarskienė, Rūta (2001). "Skudučiavimo ištakos" [The Origins of Skudučiai]. Darbai ir dienos (in Lithuanian) (25): 39–70. ISSN 1392-0588.
- Chiseliță, Vasile (2002). Muzica instrumentală din nordul Bucovinei. Repertoriul de fluier [Instrumental music from northern Bukovina. The fluier repertoire] (in Romanian). Chișinău: Știința. ISBN 9975-67-256-6.
- Черкаський, Леонід (2003). "Кувиці". Українські народні музичні інструменти [Ukrainian folk musical instruments] (in Ukrainian). Київ: Техніка. ISBN 966-575-111-5. Archived from the original on 2 February 2019.
- Civallero, Edgardo (2012). "Flautas de Pan" [Pan Flutes]. Revista de Folklore (in Spanish) (2012). Edición digital: Fundación Joaquín Díaz: 40–79. ISSN 0211-1810.
- Libin, Laurence, ed. (2014). The Grove Dictionary of Musical Instruments. Vol. 2 (Daadua – Hymn Technology Ltd) (2 ed.). New York: Oxford University Press. ISBN 978-0-19-935030-8.
- Šimonytė-Žarskienė, Rūta (2016). "Tradicinis skudučiavimas Šiaurės rytų Lietuvoje ir Biržų krašte" [Traditional skudučiai playing in Northeast Lithuania and the Biržai region] (PDF). Lietuvos lokaliniai tyrimai (in Lithuanian): 1–18. ISSN 2029-0799.

== External sources ==
- dexonline.ro. "Fifăi" (in Romanian). Archived from the original on 2021-12-07.
- Fifă (film) (1976). "Cântecul pământului. Fifă" [Song of the Earth. Fifă]. youtube.com (in Romanian).
- discogs.com (1979). "Yugoslavia. Narodna Muzička Tradicija Iz Raznih Krajeva". Discogs. Archived from the original on 2025-09-18.
- Belgorod Museum of Folk Culture. "Кугиклы" (in Russian). Белгородский государственный музей народной культуры. Archived from the original on 2022-07-07.
