= Miorița =

Old Romanian pastoral ballad; important piece of Romanian folklore

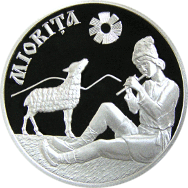
Reverse of a commemorative 50 Moldovan lei coin dedicated to Miorița

"Miorița" (ad. mioriță, lit. 'The Little Ewe Lamb'), also transliterated as "Mioritza", is an old Romanian pastoral ballad considered to be one of the most important pieces of Romanian folklore. It has numerous versions with quite different content, but the literary version by poet Vasile Alecsandri (1850) is the best known and praised. This had previously been the oldest known written text, arousing suspicion that the poet may have authored it entirely, until the discovery was made of a version from the 1790s.

== Etymology ==
The Romanian word mioriță, with diminutive suffix -ița, is the diminutive form of mioară meaning 'ewe lamb', therefore, the literal meaning is "little ewe lamb". Some have translated the title as "The Lambkin".

== Summary ==
A summary adhering to the plotline of Alecsandri's poem is as follows:

Three shepherds, one a Moldovan, another a Transilvanian (ungurean) (Note: Romanian ungurean is not actually "Hungarian"; rather, it means "someone from Hungary-land", i.e. a Romanian residing in the Hungarian-ruled portion of Transylvania, thus construed as "Transylvanian". The word is Ungur for 'Hungarian'.) and the third a Wallachian/Vrâncean, meet while tending their flocks of sheep.

In the Moldovan's flock, there is a black-fleeced (or black-spotted) (Note: Newcombe's translation gives "black sheep", yet the footnote glosses lău (m.), laie (f.) as 'gray'. The term lai is defined as "sheep with black or gray wool; wool (of inferior quality) sheared from such sheep" in one dictionary (cf. Titkin's Romanian-German) and as "black or spotted/speckled with black" in another.) and black-muzzled animal (Note: While Nandriș (1945), p. 292 glosses "bucălău" as "with black mouth (of sheep)", this is listed as a secondary sense (with Miorița given as usage example) in Titkin's Romanian-German dictionary, where the primary sense given is "(of sheep), with black or gray fur". Iordan's dictionary defines it as "one or both cheeks being lăi (=gray)". It is applied to depigmentation on the scalp and tail in one agricultural science paper.) (or perhaps flecked with gray). It is an enchanted ewe lamb which can talk, and it informs its master that the other two are plotting to murder him so they can steal his livestock (sheep, horses, hounds). The shepherd is resigned to the fate of his own death, and instructs the lamb that in the event of his murder, the lamb is to go ask his killers to bury his body by the sheepfold (sheep's pen; Romanian: stână). The ewe was also to tell all his other sheep that he has married a princess during a wedding attended by the elements of nature, marked by a falling star, this cosmic event with nuptial elements represents the Moldovan shepherd's vision of death.

The shepherd also requests that his three instruments—a little flute or shepherd's pipe (fluierașa) made of beech, another flute-pipe made bone, and a third flute-pipe made of elderwood—be buried beside his head, so that whenever the wind blew, the flutes would play and the sheep would gather. (Note: So here it is indicated that the fluieraș is an instrument for gathering herds by sound in animal husbandry. It has been remarked that the hero Făt-Frumos similarly owns a bone pipe, used to summon his animal helpers. But the shepherd's flute (fluieraș, tilincă) is a musical instrument as well, accompanying the performance of the doina.)

The poem concludes with shepherd's instruction for the ewe to act as messenger to his aging mother: she is to be told the same story, that he has gone off to marry a princess at heaven's gate (or marry the Black Earth in some versions). (Note: He will marry the princess "Pe-o gură de rai (at heaven's gate)", which echoes the opening lines of the ballad Pe un picior de plai, /Pe-o gură de rai", printed on a Moldavian banknote. This is translated "Near a low foothill / At Heaven's doorsill" by Snodgrass and "To the meadow's edge /To heaven's gate" by Latham. "On a low hillside /Where the heaven spreads wide" is how Newcombe rhymed the couplet, but the footnote indicates that the latter signifies "like the entry into paradise".) According to the shepherd's earlier instructions (to give to the other sheep), what will become of him is that The Hills will officiate as the priest, and the Sun and Moon act as his godparents—in other words, he is describing his own imminent death in veiled terms, completely allegorized as a Romanian wedding.

== Textual sources ==
The pastoral ballad has been passed down in a widespread area across the Romanian provinces, with Moldavia at the core. There have been over one thousand versions collected, the best-known and lauded is the reworking by Vasile Alecsandri published in the winter of 1850, perhaps collected directly from street minstrels. The claim that Alecu Russo was the ballad's discoverer who supplied the material to the poet has been subject to skepticism, since nothing has been found among Russo's papers to substantiate it.

A version predating Alecsandri's by several decades came to light in 1991, inscribed in the journals of Gheorghe Șincai from the first half of the 1790s. The Alecsandri version is not entirely different from this, thus establishing that there were indeed original base texts available to him at the time to be reworked, rather than him having to reconstruct the ballad out of whole cloth.

It has also been asserted that the ballad originates from the Vrancea district, but the role of the murderous Vrâncean shepherd is replaced by a Jewish shepherd in known Vrâncean variants of the ballad. The ballad occurs in every Romanian province (thus also in Oltenia and Bessarabia), (Note: In former Yugoslavia and Macedonia also.), and the names (nationalities) of the shepherds and geographical details depends on the localization. The Transylvanian version lacks the lamb's clairvoyance, but retains the last will concerning the objects to bury and cosmic wedding.

=== Translations ===
A prose translation in English, "Miora", appeared in E.C. Grenville Murray's Doĭne: Or, the National Songs and Legends of Roumania (1853). This was followed by Lord Henry Stanley's verse translations (1856) into English, as well as French.

A translation by N.W. Newcombe was also printed in Grigore Nandriș's Colloquial Romanian (1945). The ballad was also rendered under the title "Mioritza: The Canticle of the Sheep, the Enchanted Ewe", by Octavian Buhociu (The Pastoral Paradise: Romanian Folklore, 1966). Translations by Pulitzer Prize-winning poet William D. Snodgrass appeared in Miorița (1972), Cinci Balade Populare. Five Folk Ballads (c. 1993) and Selected Translations ("The Ewe Lamb", 1998). A translation by Ernest H. Latham Jr. was published in a Doca's grammar book in 1995; Latham's version (with Kiki Skagen Munshi as co-translator) appeared in his 2020 monograph on the poem.

== In other cultures ==
The Csángós and the Hungarians of Transylvania know the ballad as Szép Fejér Juhászka (Hungarian: The Beautiful White Shepherd). The story is about a shepherd who is approached by three strangers (thieves, Tatars, Wallachian shepherds, pig herders) who want his sheep. Sensing that death awaits him, he asks them to bury his sültü (shepherd's flute) next to him (so that when the wind blows it, people could hear him) and to tell his mother that he is "married to the lard of the earth and to the sister of the sun".

== Analysis ==
A comprehensive study was made by Adrian Fochi (Miorița, 1964), compiling 538 examples of the ballad to illustrate, with additional fragments and variants.

Miorița was identified as one of the four cornerstone myths used as theme in Romanian folk poetry, according to the analysis of George Călinescu (1941). (Note: The other three being the zburător (sburător) myth, the Trajan and Dochia myth, and Meșterul Manole.)

Although the poem may be seen as an exemplar traditional Christianity, i.e., turning the other cheek, Mircea Eliade sees "cosmic Christianity" at work, i.e., "the capacity to annul the apparently irremediable consequences of a tragic event by charging them with previously unsuspected values". Man's bond with Nature is emphasized: this "mystical solidarity" is what enables the shepherd to overcome his fate. This bond with Nature is also spoken in terms of the "cosmic marriage" or "mioritic marriage".

== Legacy ==
The Miorița ballad is summarized and discussed by Mircea Eliade in Zalmoxis, The Vanishing God (1972), and plays a fundamental role in his novel The Forbidden Forest.

The poem was quoted extensively by Patrick Leigh Fermor in his account of the second part of a journey on foot from Holland to Constantinople in 1933–34. He includes a partial translation of the poem which he refers to as "ramshackle but pretty accurate", which was completed during an extended stay in Eastern Romania before September 1939.

The Miorița is often referred to in Marcus Sedgwick's novel My Swordhand is Singing (2006).

== See also ==
- When the shepherd lost his sheep – an archaic Romanian pastoral poem that combines narrative, music, ritual, and drama.
