= Doină cu noduri =

Archaic Romanian song with a "knotted" glottal technique

- Native name: Romanian: doină cu noduri
- Other names: hore cu noduri, hore în grumaz
- Stylistic origins: Doina

Fusion genres
- Hăulit

Regional scenes
- Romania

Local scenes
- Oltenia, Maramureș, Oaș, Lăpuș

Doină cu noduri (Romanian for "doina with knots", also: Romanian: hore cu noduri, hore în grumaz), is an archaic genre of the Romanian traditional music, distinguished by an intermittent, "stuttering" performance technique. This style creates a tense and expressive effect in which the voice seems to be momentarily caught or paused before re-emerging.

The genre is a variety of the doina – an improvisational solo song performed without metrical accompaniment and in a free tempo. Unlike the regular doina, the doina cu noduri is characterized by a special technique of vocal ornamentation based on short, sharp sounds that occur at the onset of a note through the accented action of the glottis.

One of the folk names for this style – hore în grumaz (Note: Romanian: hore (lungă) – regional name for the doina in Maramureș, Lăpuș, and Oaș; not to be confused with the dance hora.) (from Romanian for "throat doina; singing from the larynx") – emphasizes that the complex vocal articulation is concentrated directly in the larynx, in contrast to more open, chest-based singing.

Songs of this genre have survived only in northwestern Oltenia, as well as in Oaș, Maramureș, and Lăpuș, and are considered one of the most archaic forms of the Romanian doina. Today, the genre is on the verge of extinction.

In 2009, the doina cu noduri, along with other types of doina, was inscribed on the UNESCO Intangible Cultural Heritage Lists.

== The doina as a genre basis ==
- Doină cu noduri
- Cristina Gh. Pavel – Nu stiu, Doamne, ce mi-e mie (Gorj, Oltenia, 1939)
- Cristina Gh. Pavel – Doină cu hăulit: „Ferice, codre, de tine” (Gorj, Oltenia, 1940)
- Maria Pop – De săracu mîndruțu (Oaş, 1940)
- Viorica Hereș – Badeluc cu patru boi (Maramureș)
- Nicolae Pițiș – Hore-n grumaz (Lăpuș)
- Mărioara Mureșan – Hore cu noduri (Maramureș)
- Gavrilă Damian – Măicuță când m-ai făcut (Maramureș)
- Ana Buda – Mult mă-ntreabă sfânta lună (Lăpuș)
- La porţile ceriului: Horea în grumaz (Maramureș)

The doina is a traditional Romanian genre of solo singing that expresses deep personal feelings: longing, loneliness, pain, and love. It is distinguished by its free rhythm (parlando rubato), individual improvisation, and a wealth of melismas and ornamentation. The musical material is built on short melodic formulas that the performer varies at their discretion.

Unlike the common lyric song, the doina is not a collective performance but a confessional, intimate expression of emotions, akin to a lament or an inner monologue. Lyric songs typically have a clear meter and regular rhythm, whereas the doina is performed in a free, flexible tempo. The same text can be performed as either a doina or a song – the difference lies in the musical style and character of the performance.

The distinction between these genres goes back to Constantin Brăiloiu, who introduced the concept of the "doina proper" (doina propriu-zisă) in contrast to the "song proper" (cântecul propriu-zis).

In Romanian tradition, there are many folk names for the doina, reflecting its musical features, the landscape or situational context of its performance, and the character of the emotion: hore lungă (long doina), cântec lung (long song), de lung (drawn-out), doină cu noduri (doina with knots), hore cu noduri (doina with knots), hore din grumaz (throat doina), ca pe plai (as on the mountain meadow (Note: Romanian: plai denotes gentle mountain or hill slopes, usually covered with pasture (cf. the Hutsul polonyna). In a broader sense, it means region or land, e.g., plai natal – native land. (dexonline.ro 2025))), ca pe luncă (as in the riverside meadow), ca pe coastă (as on the slope), ca la munte (as in the mountains), ca la câmp (as in the field), de codru (of the forest), de deal (from the hill), de ducă (of departure), de dragoste (of love), de haiduc (of the haiduk), de jale (of sorrow), and others. (Note: In the first decades of the 20th century, the term "doina" was used in village culture as just one of many names for songs of this genre. For example, Constantin Brăiloiu recorded in 1930 the words of an informant from Gorj County (Oltenia): "The old people don't understand what a doina is. I understand because I know from books: a doina is a cântec lung ('long song')". (Kahane 2007, p. 17) Over time, middle-aged informants who had received school education and participated in institutionalized forms of "folk culture" and amateur arts began to describe the doina as "the musical genre of a solitary person" or as a "special inner experience." Furthermore, under the influence of folklorism, mass media, and festival practices, they began to call most songs performed at a slow tempo doinas, including those structured in a regular syllabic rhythm (giusto-syllabic), thereby blurring the line between the doina and other lyric genres. (Secară 2010, p. 202))

The archaic form of the doina with its characteristic intermittent vocal technique has survived in only two regions of Romania: in Gorj County (Oltenia) – as the doina cu noduri – and in the regions of Oaș, Maramureș, and Lăpuș – as the hore cu noduri or hore în grumaz.

== History of study ==
The first description of the characteristic "with knots" singing belongs to the Hungarian composer and ethnomusicologist Béla Bartók. In the early 20th century, he characterized the Romanian hore lungă from Maramureș (the local name for doinas) as containing "sobbing tones," which he called Schluchztöne in German. Bartók did not describe the vocal technique but mentioned that he considered these sounds "impossible for outsiders to reproduce". The German term he used was later established in Romanian ethnomusicological literature.

During his expedition to Maramureș, Bartók did not encounter men performing hore lungă with knots. This led him to conclude that this technique was exclusively part of the women's repertoire. However, subsequent research by Romanian ethnomusicologists did not confirm this conclusion.

Constantin Brăiloiu recorded samples of doina cu noduri in Oltenia and in Someș County (Note: Someș County in the interwar period covered parts of southern Oaș and Maramureș, including the territory of the Lăpuș region) in the 1930s.

In the following decades, the doina cu noduri became the subject of field research and analysis by a number of Romanian ethnomusicologists, including: Tiberiu Brediceanu, Mariana Kahane, Eugenia Cernea, Emilia Comișel, Gheorghe Pop, Pamfil Bilțiu, Grigore Leșe, and Constantin Secară.

== Technical and musical features ==
=== Vocal technique ===
The performance technique of the doina cu noduri is based on a special method of sound production in which the sound originates in the throat with the active involvement of the glottis. Before each musical tone, a short, sharp "strike" of the glottis is formed – the so-called "knot" (Romanian: nod) – which interrupts the airflow and creates a guttural, constricted sound. This effect is not only audible but is also felt physiologically as a tension of the muscles around the vocal apparatus. The knot occurs not on the note itself but at the moment of its attack, forming a kind of "stutter" – an ornamental element before the sound. In experienced singers, each knot includes a subtle preparation: an imperceptible touch on a lower note, followed by a rapid upward transition and a sharp fixation on the target pitch. This technique requires considerable vocal control and is considered a sign of performance mastery.

Tiberiu Alexandru and Emilia Comișel learned from village performers that "some sing gâltuit, others sing from the throat (din gât)," while some specified: "not deep, not from the throat, but din gâltan" (from the larynx area). The folk tradition distinguishes two fundamentally different methods of sound production here. Singing "from the throat" (din gât) implies a deep, open, and drawn-out style based on chest resonance and the free passage of sound, reminiscent of some Eastern vocal techniques. In contrast, singing din gâltan is a special vocal technique in which the sound is formed in the upper part of the throat, in the area of the larynx (the folk term for this area is gâltan). The "knots" (noduri) themselves, which give the singing its characteristic intermittent texture, are the result of virtuosic work of the glottis – its sharp and rapid closing and opening. Thus, if singing din gât is based on continuous resonance, the gâltuit technique is based on virtuosic articulation and interruption of sound to create a unique ornament.

Usually, the knots are performed on the vowels u, î, or i, preceded by an "h" sound that enhances the glottal strike. When the ornament occurs outside the verse text, it is performed on refrain interjections (e.g., dzi, măi, dzî; duinu; dui).

The performance of "knots" is a display of virtuosity. Some less gifted performers are only able to render the melodic line of the corresponding formulas without performing the knots themselves. "Not everyone can do it – only those who can sing with knots are chosen," said a performer from Maramureș.

Eugenia Cernea notes that the folk expression cu noduri ("with knots") is a more accurate and figurative designation for the vocal technique characteristic of doinas from Maramureș and Oaș. It is much closer to reality than the terms sometimes used by folklorists, such as "hiccup-like sounds" (sunete sughițate) or "gurgling sounds" (sunete gâlgâite), in an attempt to describe the features of the local performance.

=== Regional features ===
Although the technique of knots is similar in the Maramureș and Oaș regions, there are important regional differences. In Maramureș (especially in the Sighet and Vișeu areas), the "knot formulas" have a more complex, syncopated rhythm, whereas in Oaș, the rhythm of such phrases is generally regular and straightforward. These differences highlight the richness and local specificity of the archaic forms of the doina.

In Oltenia, in Gorj County, the knots are expressed more softly. Here, doina cu noduri can be accompanied by hăulit, another archaic singing technique similar to the Alpine yodel.

A characteristic feature of the hore lungă from Maramureș is that it contains no other types of ornamentation besides the knots. In the Oltenian doinas, the knots are only one of several types of ornamentation.

In addition to the main distribution areas isolated cases of the performance of doina cu noduri have been documented outside these regions, for example, in the village of Vădăstrița (Olt County), which neighbors Gorj County. This local tradition has its own characteristics: the melody is based on a Dorian mode with a mobile fourth degree, but with even greater pitch instability (the third degree sometimes surprisingly appears as a major third). The "knots" themselves are performed lightly, as in Gorj, but the ornamentation differs: the glottal stop here is accompanied by an appoggiatura that starts from the lower semitone of the main note.

== Modern status ==
The gradual disappearance of the archaic vocal manner of performance characteristic of the doina cu noduri has been accompanied by a change in attitude towards it within the village communities themselves. As early as the beginning of the 20th century, such melodies were perceived by the younger generation as outdated and even comical. An illustrative example is provided by Constantin Brăiloiu, who in August 1930 in the village of Runcu (Gorj County, Oltenia) recorded the story of a 9-year-old schoolgirl, Maria Arbagic. The girl spoke mockingly of the guttural sounds characteristic of the old melodies her mother performed. She compared them to a "donkey's bray" and declared that these songs were "so ugly you want to run away".

A similar attitude was noted by Speranța Rădulescu during her field research in 1985. In the city of Zalău (Sălaj County (Note: Sălaj is a county in Transylvania, adjacent to Maramureș, Oaș, and Lăpuș, and influenced by their culture.)), 25-year-old Lenuța Petruș stated:

With these "knots," we don't even consider it a song. We say that these women don't know how to sing. I didn't like how she sang with knots.

=== Modern performers ===
Nicolae Pițiș (1939–2022) was a Romanian folk singer and shepherd from Țara Lăpușului. He gained fame after performing doinas and playing the trâmbiță (a type of bucium, large Romanian shepherd's horn) and the double fluier in Mircea Moldovan's film Pintea (1976), dedicated to the haiduk Pintea the Brave from Maramureș. As a bearer of the archaic style of throat-singing doina, Pițiș was recognized as a "Living Human Treasure" in 2012 and was awarded a number of honors for his contribution to the preservation of intangible cultural heritage.

Mărioara Mureșan (born 1960) is a contemporary singer from Maramureș whose repertoire includes traditional throat-singing doinas. She began collecting them in her childhood while traveling through villages and performs them in an authentic manner inherited from older generations.

== See also ==
- Doina
- Hăulit

== Sources ==
- Bartók, Béla (1923). Volksmusik der Rumänen von Maramures [Folk music of the Romanians of Maramureș] (in German). München: Drei Masken Verlag.
- Brăiloiu, Constantin (1970). "Outline of a Method of Musical Folklore (1931)". Ethnomusicology. 14 (3): 389–417.
- Brăiloiu, Constantin (1974). Comişel, Emilia (ed.). "La musique populaire roumaine (1940)" [Romanian folk music]. Opere (in French). 3. Bucureşti: Editura Muzicală a Uniunii Compozitorilor din Republica Socialista România: 128–137.
- Brediceanu, Tiberiu (1957). 170 melodii populare din Maramureş [170 folk songs from Maramureş] (in Romanian). Bucureşti: Editura de stat pentru literatură și artă.
- Bîrlea, Ovidiu (1959). "Folclorul şi unele probleme ale dezvoltării poporului romîn" [Folklore and some problems of the development of the Romanian people]. Revista de etnografie şi folclor (in Romanian). IV (1–2): 195–204.
- Kahane, Mariana (1963). "Doine din Oltenia subcarpatică" [Doine from Subcarpathian Oltenia]. Revista de etnografie şi folclor (in Romanian). VIII (1–2): 99–116.
- Kahane, Mariana (1967). "Trăsături specifice ale doinei din Oltenia subcarpatică" [Specific features of the doina from Subcarpathian Oltenia]. Revista de etnografie şi folclor (in Romanian). 12 (3): 203–211.
- Cernea, Eugenia (1970). "Doina din nordul Transilvaniei. Contribuții la studiul particularităților compoziționale și stilistice" [Doina from northern Transylvania. Contributions to the study of compositional and stylistic peculiarities]. Studii de muzicologie (in Romanian). 6: 181–206.
- Bartók, Béla (1975). Suchoff, Benjamin (ed.). Rumanian Folk Music. Vol. 5. Maramureș County. The Hague: Martinus Nijhoff. doi:10.1007/978-94-010-1686-5. ISBN 978-94-010-1688-9.
- Alexandru, Tiberiu (1975). Muzica populară românească [Romanian folk music] (in Romanian). București: Editura muzicală.
- Comişel, Emilia (1979). "Doina („horea lungă") din nordul Transilvaniei" [Doina ("long song") from northern Transylvania]. Samus, II, Centrul de Îndrumare a Creației Artistice Populare (in Romanian). Cluj, Dej.
- Pop, Gheorghe (1982). Folclor muzical din Maramureş [Musical folklore from Maramureş] (in Romanian). Baia Mare: Centrul de Îndrumare a Creaţiei Populare şi a Mişcării Artistice de Masă al judeţului Maramureş, Societatea profesorilor de muzică şi desen, Asociaţia Folcloriştilor şi Etnografilor.
- Marian, Marin (1989). "O interpretă a cântării „cu foc"" [A performer of singing "with fire"]. Revista de etnografie şi folclor (in Romanian). 34 (1): 66.
- Rădulescu, Speranţa (1990). Cântecul.Tipologie muzicală I. Transilvania meridională [Song. Musical typology I. Southern Transylvania] (in Romanian). Bucureşti: Editura muzicală.
- Oprea, Gheorghe (1998). "Folclor muzical din Vădăstrița – Romanați" [Musical folklore from Vădăstrița – Romanați]. Revista de etnografie şi folclor (in Romanian). 43 (1–2): 7–28.
- Leşe, Grigore (2001). La obârşii. Melodii culese, transcrise şi interpretate de [At the origins. Melodies collected, transcribed and interpreted by] (in Romanian). Bistriţa: Editura Charmides. ISBN 973-85066-3-8.
- Scheianu, Nicolae; Lupescu, Bogdan; Rădulescu, Speranţa (2002). "Rapsodul Nicolae Piţiş" [The Rhapsode Nicolae Pițiș]. Memoria Ethnologica (in Romanian). II (2–3): 352–358. ISSN 1582-8573.
- Kahane, Mariana (2007). Lupaşcu, Marian (ed.). Doina vocală din Oltenia. Tipologie muzicală [Vocal Doina from Oltenia. Musical typology] (in Romanian). Bucureşti: Editura Academiei Române. ISBN 978-973-27-1544-4.
- Chiseliță, Vasile (2009). "Cântecul liric non-ritual. Doina și cântecul propriu-zis" [The non-ritual lyrical song. Doina and the "song proper"]. Arta muzicală a Moldovei. Istorie și modernitate (in Romanian). Chișinău: Grafema Libris: 308–338. ISBN 978-9975-52-046-1.
- Secară, Constantin (2010). "„Hori" și „hori în grumaz" din Țara Lăpușului. Confluențe, sincretisme și variante vocal-instrumentale (I)" ["Hori" and "hori în grumaz" from Țara Lăpușului. Confluences, syncretisms and vocal-instrumental variants (I)]. Anuarul Institutului de etnografie şi folclor „C. Brăiloiu", serie nouă (in Romanian). 21: 199–209.
- Cernea, Eugenia (2011). Secară, Constantin (ed.). Doina din Maramureș, Oaș și Bucovina [Doina from Maramureș, Oaș and Bukovina] (in Romanian). Bucureşti: Editura Global. ISBN 978-606-92922-3-5.
- Bilțiu, Pamfil; Csiszár, Corina Isabella (2023). "Un cântec i-a fost toată viața. In memoriam Nicolae Piţiş (1939 – 2022)" [A song was his whole life. In memoriam Nicolae Piţiş (1939 – 2022)]. Memoria Ethnologica (in Romanian). XXIII (86–87): 174–183. ISSN 1582-8573.

== External sources ==
- dexonline.ro (2025). "Plai". Archived from the original on 2025-06-15.
- limbaromana.org (2022). "Nicolae Pițiș – izvor al folclorului autentic din Țara Lăpușului" [Nicolae Pițiș – source of authentic folklore from Țara Lăpușului] (in Romanian). Archived from the original on 2025-03-28.
- patrimoniu.ro (2025). "Nicolae Pițiș (jud. Maramureș)" [Nicolae Pițiș (Maramureș County)] (in Romanian). Institutul Național al Patrimoniului România. Archived from the original on 2025-04-14.
- unesco.org (2025). "Doina". UNESCO. Archived from the original on 2025-07-29.
