= Ca din tulnic =

Ca din tulnic is a unique type of doina in which the melody resembles a type of Alpenhorn called the tulnic.
