= Hore lungă =

Romanian regional folksong style

Hore lungă (Cântec lung, Rom., literally 'long song'), is a Romanian regional folksong style characterized by the union of a lyrical text and improvisational melody.

Also called hore lunga or horea lunga, (hore here is derived from the Romanian word meaning 'oration').

The singing may be accompanied by a combination of the shepherd's flute, a leaf held between the lips and used as a reed, a bagpipe, and non-native instruments.

== Characteristics ==
A variant of the doina, the Hore lungă characteristics are: strong instrumental character, very ornamented, and indeterminate content structure. The musician may freely stretch or compress its rhythm, and often will highly ornament each note.

== History ==
Discovered by Béla Bartók in the Romanian Northern Transylvania counties of Maramureş and Satu-Mare in 1912-1913. Bartók studied evidence of or listened to similar music in central Algeria, Ukraine, and Persia. Subsequent research has revealed similar music found as far west as Albania and Algeria, and as far east as India, Tibet, western China, and Cambodia.

== See also ==
- Doină cu noduri
