= Vădăstrița =

- Commune
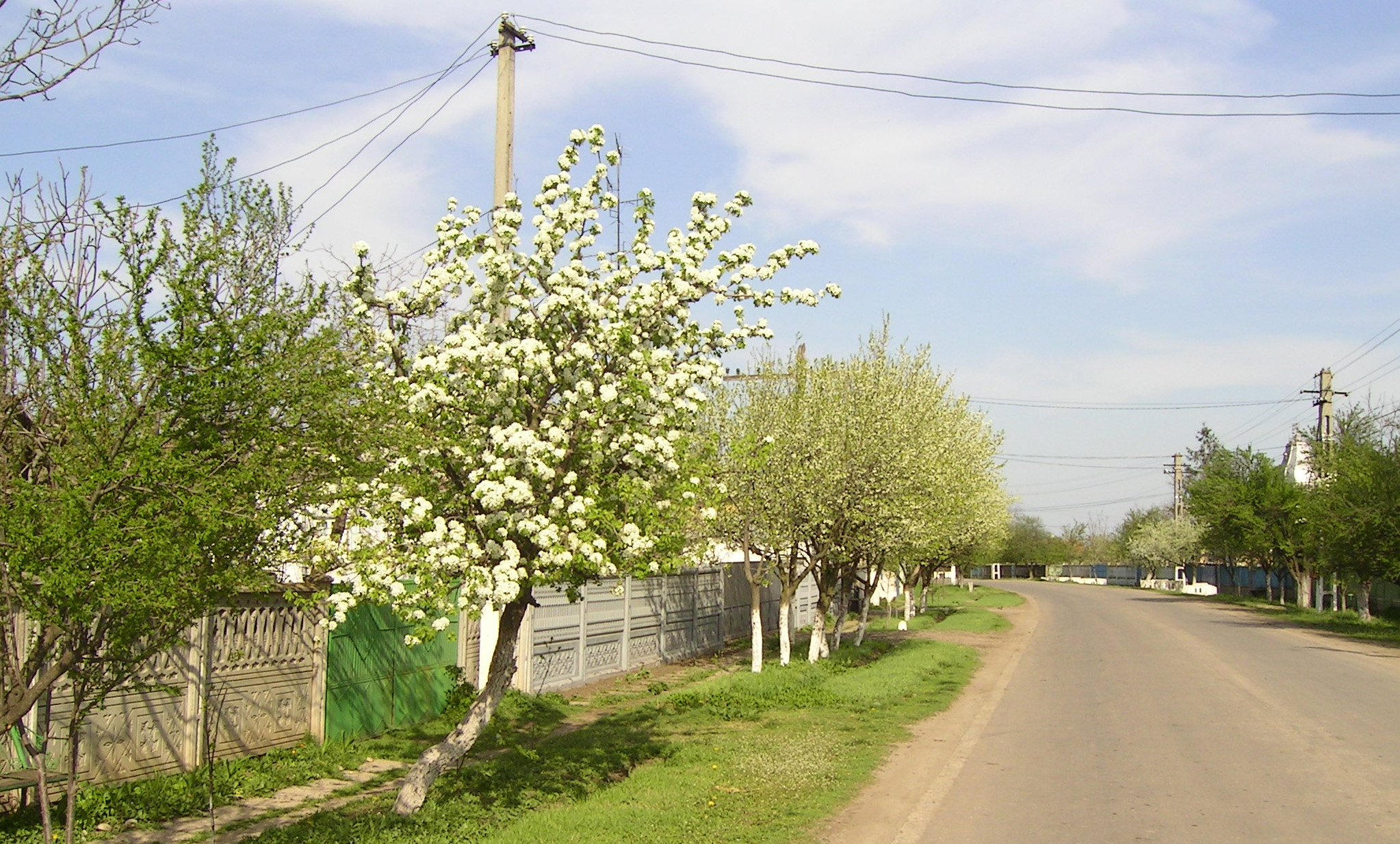

- Location in Romania
- Coordinates: 43°51′N 24°20′E
- Country: Romania
- County: Olt
- Area: 44 km^{2} (17 sq mi)
- Population (2021-12-01): 3,002
  - Density: 68/km^{2} (180/sq mi)
- Time zone: UTC+02:00 (EET)
  - Summer (DST): UTC+03:00 (EEST)
- Vehicle reg.: OT

Vădăstrița is a commune in Olt County, Oltenia, Romania. It is composed of a single village, Vădăstrița.
