= Buțeni =

- Village
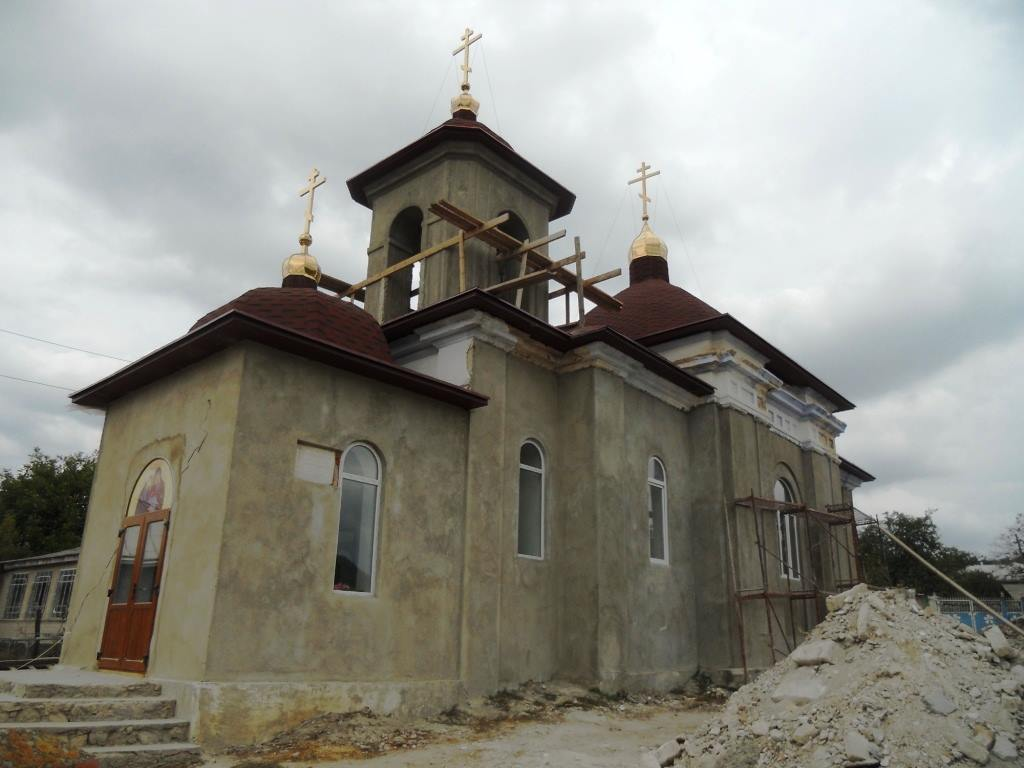

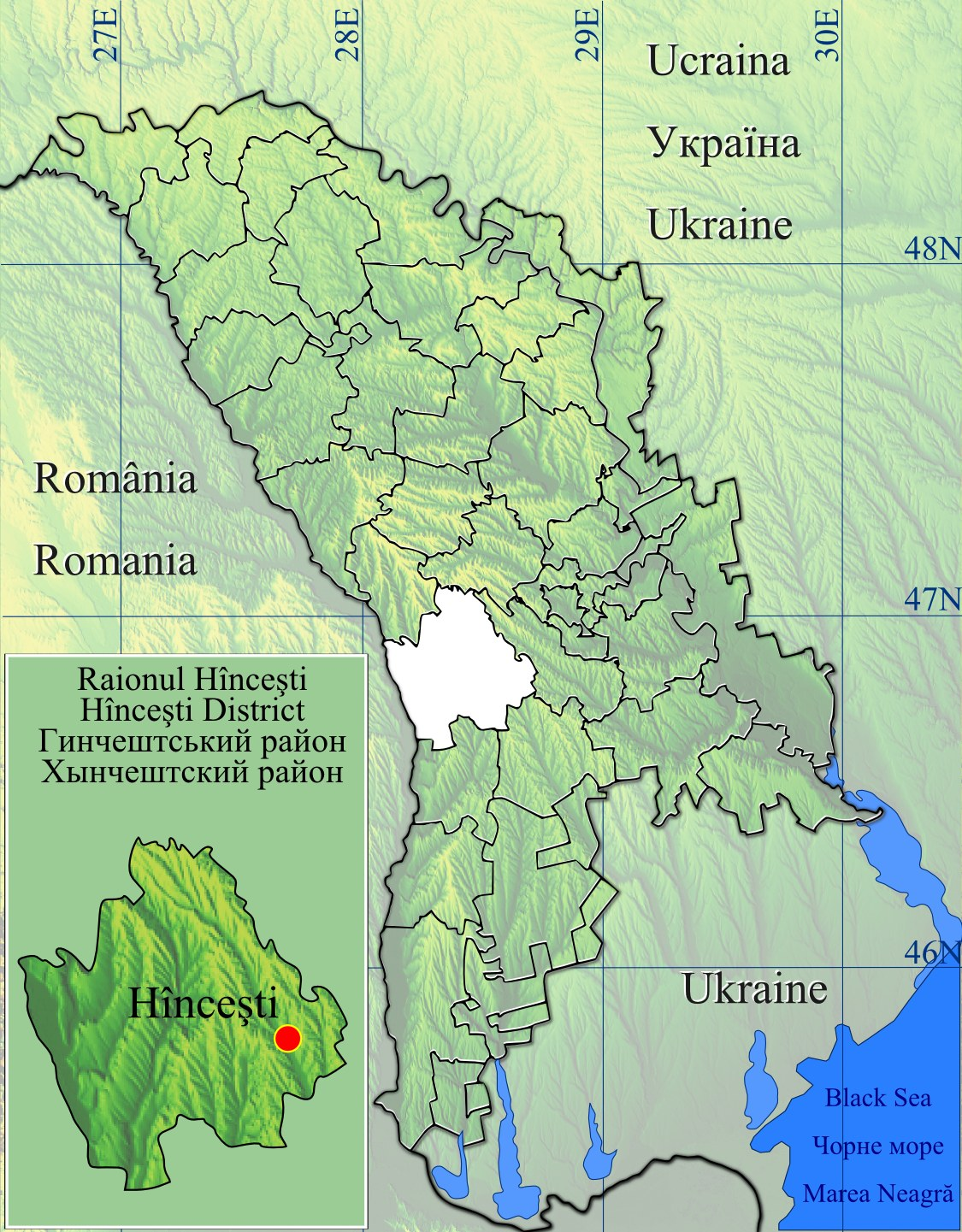
- Location within Hîncești
- Coordinates: 46°49′51″N 28°40′30″E
- Country: Moldova

Government
  - Mayor: Ion Harbuz (PLDM)

Population (2014 census)
  - Total: 3,399
- Time zone: UTC+2 (EET)
  - Summer (DST): UTC+3 (EEST)
- Postal code: MD-3417

Buțeni is a village in Hîncești District, Moldova.
