= Oltului =

Type of Romanian folk song, or Doina, sung near the area of the River Olt

Oltului is a type of Romanian folk song, or Doina, sung near the area of the River Olt. Oltului were performed by professional ensembles as part of state-sponsored cultural management efforts during the period of Communist control of Romania.
