= Kuvytsi =

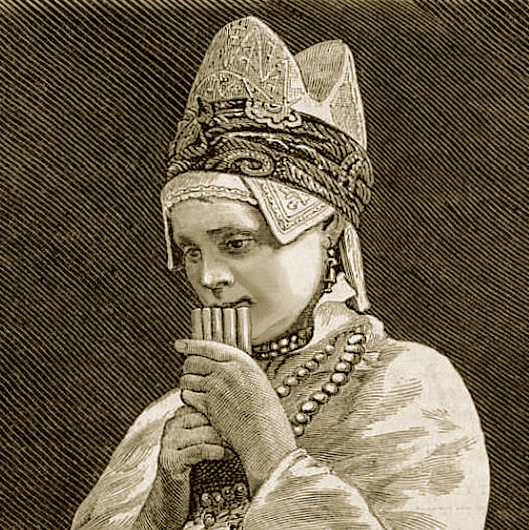
- Kugikly. Russia, Kursk Governorate. 1871
- Classification: Aerophone
- Hornbostel–Sachs classification: 421.112.11

Playing range
- g^{4}-c^{6}

Related instruments
- Rebro; Svyryli; Pan pipes

The kuvytsi (Ukrainian: Кувиці), kugikly, kuvikly (Russian: Кугиклы, Кувиклы) are the Ukrainian and Russian variant of pan pipes. Pan pipes have been found in archeological excavations in Ukraine that date back some 5,000 years. The instrument consists of several pipes each of which, when blown endwise, produces one sound. Various versions of the kuvytsi exist in Ukraine, such as the one-sided kuvytsi, which consist of a system of pipes from great to small in one lode or two-sided kuvytsi, which have their greatest pipe in the center.

These instruments were used by ensembles in Chernihiv Province and also widely in Western Ukraine. These instruments allow chromatic notes to be readily obtained, a semitone lower than the primary sound of the pipe. This is done by bending the angle of the pipes with relation to the player's lips. The air stream is thus broken on the far end of the pipe, rather than the end closest the lips.

== See also ==
- Ukrainian folk music
- Russian traditional music

== Sources ==
- Kugikly — article from the Great Russian Encyclopedia.
- Humeniuk, A., Ukrainski narodni muzychni instrumenty, Kyiv: Naukova dumka, 1967
- Mizynec, V., Ukrainian Folk Instruments, Melbourne: Bayda books, 1984
- Cherkaskyi, L., Ukrainski narodni muzychni instrumenty // Tekhnika, Kyiv, Ukraine, 2003. 262 pages. ISBN 966-575-111-5
