= Cântec de leagăn =

Cântec de leagăn ("cradle song") is a lullaby in Romania which is a free form song performed in personal and unstructured context. There is some debate as to whether or not it may have spawned the doina musical style.
