= Cântec batrânesc =

Traditional form of ballad

Cântec batrânesc is a traditional form of ballad which originates from Romania. It is similar to an epic poem and it is one of the most typical genres of Romanian literature.

== Origin ==
The name comes from the Latin word ballare, meaning "dancing". Both terms were entailed by the Romanian poet Vasile Alecsandri. However, the usual term for this form of ballad is still epic song.

== Notes ==
Being a folkloric genre, the ballad has specific notes of folkloric literature:

- is anonymous
- is oral and collective (is transmitted from generation to generation)
- is syncretic (represents the contribution of many artistic patterns, like sung poetry, carols, incantations, etc.

Ballads are epic creations in which the next themes are brought out:

- the outlaw's actions
- historical events
- bravery of the hero
- human behavior

The characters have almighty features, presented in antithesis, being the opposite of each other.

== Themes ==
- love
- the good and the bad
- the hankering, the longing
- the immolation for the creation
- the connection between humans and the nature
- the revolt, the riots
- the irreversibility of time

== Myths in epic songs ==
- the immolation for the creation
- the erotic myth (the myth illustrates how girls at puberty long for the unknown feeling of love, which comes unexpectedly and makes them feel something very deep and spontaneous)
- the formation of the Romanian collectivity
- the transhumance myth (human attitude towards death)
