= Grigore Nandriș =

- Born: 17 January 1895; Mahala, Chernivtsi, Austria-Hungary
- Died: 2 March 1968, (73 years old); Kew, London, United Kingdom
- Education: Faculty of Letters of the University of Bucharest, University of Vienna, School Practice of Higher Studies, School of Living Oriental Languages
- Occupations: linguist; philologist; memoirist; professor
- Parent(s): Maria and Dumitru Nandriș
- Relatives: Anița Nandriș (sister)
- Writing career
- Language: Romanian

Grigore Nandriș (17 January 1895 – 2 March 1968) was a Romanian linguist, philologist and memorialist, professor at Chernivtsi, Kraków and Oxford.

He was born in Mahala, in Austria-Hungary (now in Ukraine), on 17 January 1895, and died on 2 March 1968.

== Selected works ==
- Les diphtongues à liquides dans les éléments slaves du roumain, Chernivtsi, 1925.
- Documente românești în limba slavonă din mănăstirile Muntelui Athos. 1372-1658, Bucharest, 1937.
- The Beginning of Slavonic culture in the Romanian Countries, in "Slavonic and East European Review", XXIV, 1946, no. 63, p. 160-171.
- Handbook of Old Church Slavonic, London, 1959 (7 editions between 1965 and 1977)
- Learn Rumanian for English Speakers.
- Colloquial Rumanian: Grammar, exercises, reader vocabulary (13 editions between 1945 and 1969, in English and French)
- Christian Humanism in the Neo-Byzantine Mural Painting of East Europe, Wiesbaden, 1970 (posthumous). Romanian edition: Umanismul picturii murale postbizantine, vol. I-II, Bucharest, Meridiane Publishing House, 1985.
- 8 ani din viața României (1940-1948): Pagini de jurnal, 1999.
- Learn Rumanian for English speakers, 1974.
- O radiografie a exilului românesc : corespondența emisă și primită de Grigore Nandriș, 1946-1967.
