= Doina =

Romanian musical tune style

The doina (Romanian pronunciation: [ˈdojna]) is a Romanian musical tune style, possibly with ancient Middle Eastern roots, customary in Romanian peasant music, as well as in lăutărească music. It was also adopted into klezmer music.

== Origins and characteristics ==
Béla Bartók discovered the doina in Northern Transylvania in 1912 and he believed it to be uniquely Romanian. After he found similar genres in Ukraine, Albania, Algeria, Middle East and Northern India, he came to the belief that these are part of a family of related genres of Arabo-Persian origin. He particularly linked the Romanian doina to the Turkish/Arabic Makam system. Bartók's conclusions were rejected by some Romanian ethnomusicologists, who accused Bartók of anti-Romanian bias. Similarities between the Romanian doina and various musical forms from the Middle East have been subsequently documented by both non-Romanian and Romanian scholars. Until the first half of the 20th century, both lăutari and klezmer musicians were recorded using a taksim as an introduction to a tune. The taksim would be later replaced by the doina, which has been described as being similar, though not totally identical to the taksim. Romanian ethnomusicologist and musician Grigore Leşe, after performing with a group of Iranian musicians, noticed that the doinas of Maramureş have "great affinities" with the Arabo-Persian music.

The doina is a free-rhythm, highly ornamented (usually melismatic), improvisational tune. The improvisation is done on a more or less fixed pattern (usually a descending one), by stretching the notes in a rubato-like manner, according to the performer's mood and imagination. Usually the prolonged notes are the fourth or fifth above the floor note.

The peasant doinas are mostly vocal and monophonic and are sung with some vocal peculiarities that vary from place to place: interjections (măi, hei, dui-dui, iuhu), glottal clucking sounds, choked sobbing effects, etc. Instrumental doinas are played on simple instruments, usually various types of flutes, or even on rudimentary ones, such as a leaf. The peasant doina is a non-ceremonial type of song and is generally sung in solitude, having an important psychological action: to "ease one's soul" (de stâmpărare in Romanian). Grigore Leşe believes that, while scholars describe in great detail the technical aspects of the doina, they fail to understand its psychological aspects. Doinas are lyrical in aspect and their common themes are melancholy, longing (dor), erotic feelings, love for nature, complaints about the bitterness of life or invocations to God to help ease pain, etc.

The doina is an integral component of the archaic Romanian pastoral poem "When the shepherd lost his sheep", where it expresses the shepherd’s sorrow and lamentation for his lost flock.

Unlike peasant doinas, lăutar and klezmer doinas are usually accompanied and played on more complex instruments (violin, pan-pipe, cymbalom, accordion, clarinet, tarogato, etc.). Also, unlike peasant doinas, lăutar and klezmer doinas are mostly played as an introduction to another tune, usually a dance.

In the regions of Southern Romania, Romani lăutari developed a type of doina called cântec de ascultare (meaning "song for listening", sometimes shortened to de ascultare or simply ascultare). The cântec de ascultare spread to other regions of Romania, with local particularities.

Klezmer Doinas are influenced by Hassidic niguns.

== Types of doina ==
- Hore lungă – Maramureș.
- Doină cu noduri – an archaic doina with a "knotted" glottal technique (Oltenia, Maramureș, Oaș, Lăpuș)
- Ca pe luncă – found along the Danube.
- Oltului – found along the Olt River.
- De codru – codru means "forest".
- Haiducești (cântece haiducești, Cântece de haiducie) - "haiduc's songs" haiduc means "outlaw" or "brigand".
- Ca din tulnic – unique type in which the melody imitates a type of Alpenhorn called the tulnic.
- Ciobanului – shepherd's doina.
- De dragoste – popular form, usually about love; dragoste means "love".
- De jale – mellow, mournful doina; jale means "grief".
- De leagăn – a lullaby; leagăn means "cradle".
- De pahar – drinking song; pahar means "drinking glass".
- Foaie verde – classical form; literally "green leaf".
- Klezmer – played by Jewish musicians from Bessarabia and Moldavia.

== Current status ==
While at the beginning of the 20th century, the doina was the most common type of peasant song (in some areas the only type), today it has almost completely disappeared from peasant life, as most peasant music has. This process has been accelerated during the communist era, with the rise of the new, so-called "popular music", bringing a new style of performance that diluted the peasant styles.

The doina is still, however, common in the repertoire of the lăutari from Ardeal and Banat regions.

In 1976 the BBC religious television programme The Light of Experience took Gheorge Zamfir’s recording of "Doina de jale" as its theme tune. Epic Records released the song as a single and made it to number four in the UK charts.

In 2009 the doina has been included in the UNESCO list of Intangible Cultural Heritage.
