= Constantin Brăiloiu =

Romanian composer and ethnomusicologist

Brăiloiu recording with phonograph

Constantin Brăiloiu (13 August 1893 – 20 December 1958) was a Romanian composer and internationally known ethnomusicologist.

He was born in Bucharest, the scion of an old boyar family from Oltenia. His father, Nicolae Brăiloiu, and his grandfather, Constantin N. Brăiloiu, were both lawyers and politicians. Constantin Brăiloiu studied in Bucharest (1901–1907), Vienna (1907–1909), Vevey and Lausanne (1909–1912), as well as Paris (1912–1914). In 1920, he founded the Societatea Compozitorilor Români (SCR, Society of Romanian Composers) along with other composers, and he served as general secretary of the organization between 1926 and 1943.

In 1928, he initiated the composer's collective Arhiva de folklore (folklore archive), which soon became one of the largest folk music archives of its time. From 1928 he and sociology professor Dimitrie Gusti visited the various regions of Romania in order to make sound recordings. In 1931, he published the article "Schița unei metode de folclor muzical" (Sketch of a method for music folklore), which became one of the foundational texts for ethnomusicology. He also taught at the Bucharest Conservatory where one of his students was Achim Stoia.

In 1943, he became cultural consultant for the Romanian embassy in Bern. Due to the political incidents in his homeland he stayed from then on in Switzerland. In 1944, he organized another archive in Geneva, Les Archives internationales de musique populaire (AIMP), that was part of the Musée d'ethnographie de Genève (Geneva Museum of Ethnography). He served as director for the AIMP from 1944 until his death in 1958, and collected musical recordings from all over the world. In particular, between 1951 and 1958 he released 40 volumes in the series Collection universelle de musique populaire enregistrée (Universal collection of recorded popular music) on 78 rpm records. In 1948, he became assistant professor (maître de conférence) at the CNRS in Paris.

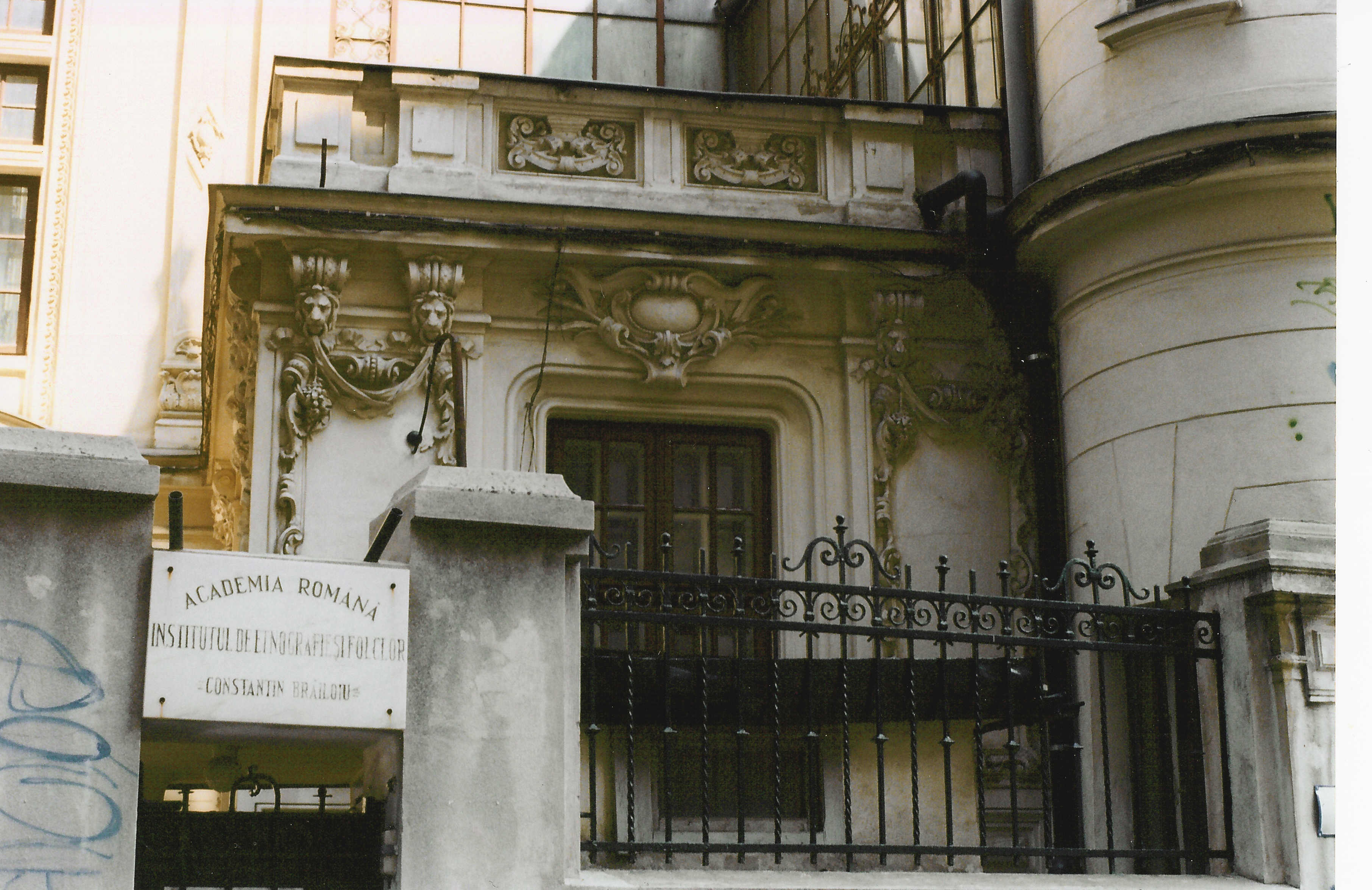
The Constantin Brăiloiu Ethnography and Folklore Institute of the Romanian Academy in Bucharest

Brăiloiu was a corresponding member of the Romanian Academy from 1946. He died in Geneva of a stroke, at age 65. The Ethnography and Folklore Institute of the Romanian Academy now bears his name.

== Writings ==
- Schița unei metode de folclor muzical ("Esquisse d'une méthode de folklore musical"). In: Boabe de Grâu, Jg. 2, Nr. 4, 1931.
- Sur une ballade roumaine : (la Mioritza). Kundig, Geneva 1946.
- A propos du Jodel. In: Kongressbericht der Internationalen Gesellschaft für Musikwissenschaft, 4. Kongress, Basel 1949. Bärenreiter Verlag, Basel 1951, S. 69–71.
- Le rythme aksak. Abbeville 1952.
- Sur une mélodie russe. In: Pierre Souvtchinsky, Vladimir Fédorov, Gisèle Brelet (Hrsg.): Musique russe. Presses Universitaires de France, Paris 1953.
- Le vers populaire roumain chanté. Ed. de l'Institut universitaire roumain Charles I, Paris 1956.
- La rythmique enfantine : notions liminaires. Elsevier, Paris/Brussels 1956.
- Folklore musical. Encyclopédie de la musique; Fasquelle, Paris 1959.
- Réflexions sur la création musicale collective. In: Diogène. (Paris) Nr. 25, 1959, S. 83–93.
- Vie musicale d'un village: recherches sur le répertoire de Dragus (Roumanie) 1929-1932. Institut universitaire roumain Charles Ier, Paris 1960.
- Problèmes d'ethnomusicologie. Minkoff Reprint, Geneva 1973. (Collected works edited by Gilbert Rouget)
- Problems of ethnomusicology. Cambridge University Press, Cambridge 1984. (English translation by A.L. Lloyd of the collected works), digitally printed (Cambridge 2009) ISBN 978-0-521-24528-9 (hbk.), ISBN 978-0-521-11744-9 (pbk.)
- Opere 1-5. Ed. Muzicală a Uniunii compozitorilor din Republica Socialistă România, Bucharest, vol. 1: 1967, vol. 2: 1969, vol. 3: 1974, vol. 4: 1979, vol. 5: 1981. (Collected works, translated and edited by Emilia Comișel)
- Opere 6. Prima Parte. Editura Muzicală, Bucharest 1998. (with Emilia Comișel)
