= Bucium =

Type of alphorn

1921 photo of a shepherd with a trâmbiță, in Giulești (Maramureș).

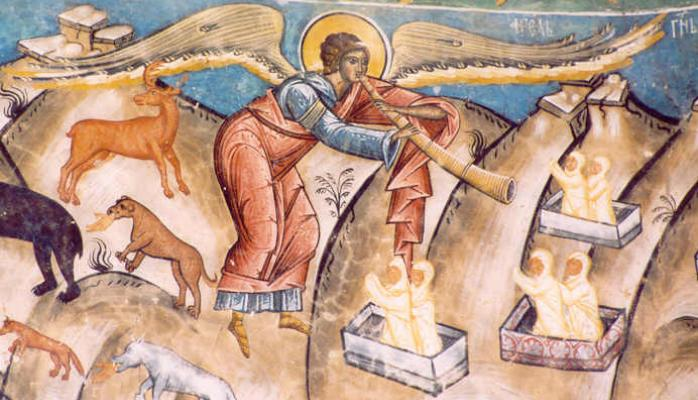
A mural in Voroneț Monastery showing an angel playing a bucium at the onset of the Last Judgement.

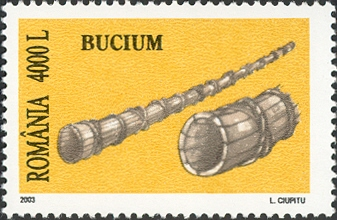

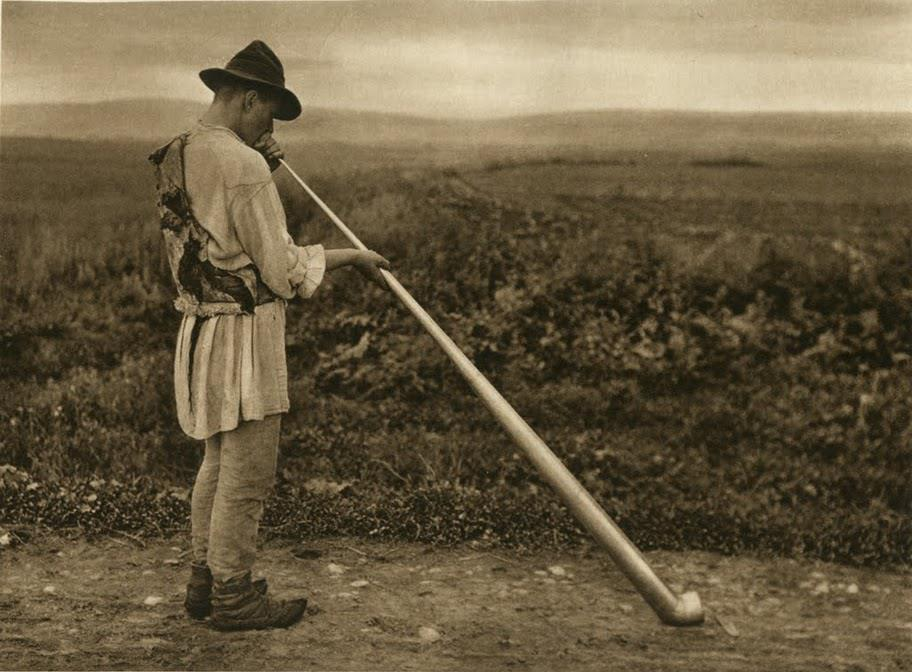

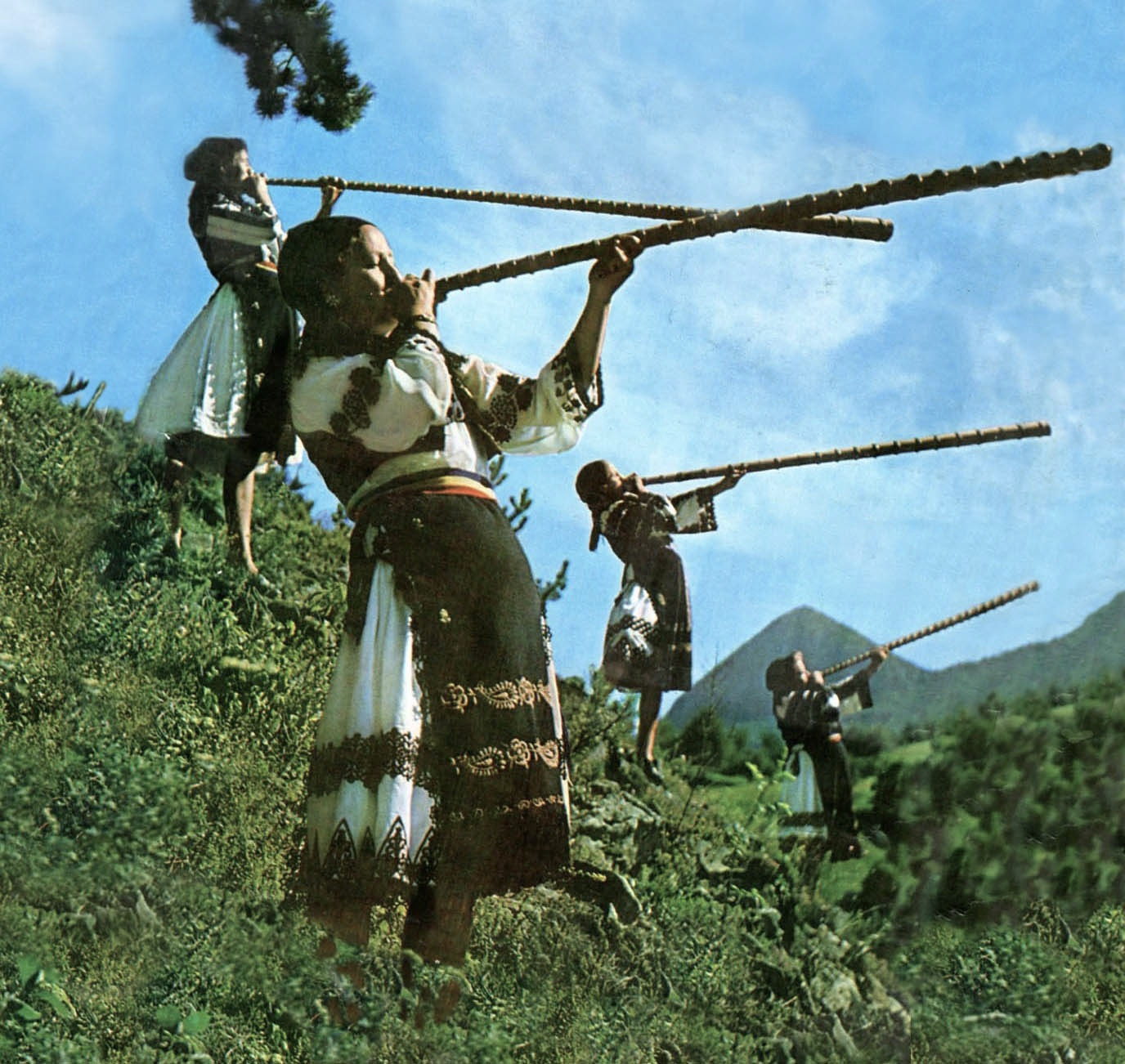

The bucium (Romanian pronunciation: [ˈbutʃjum], also called trâmbiță or tulnic) is a type of alphorn from Romania and Moldova. The word is derived from Latin bucinum, originally meaning "curved horn", an instrument used by the Romans. The word is a cognate with English "bugle".

A bucium may have either a straight or curved tube, and may be conical throughout its entire length or only in the bell. Its tube, which measures 1.5 to over 3 meters in length, may be made from fir, ash, limetree, or hazel wood and bound with birch, cherry, or lime bark. Northern Romanian versions of the bucium may incorporate metal as well. Most versions of the bucium are played by blowing into a trumpet-shaped wooden mouthpiece.

References to the bucium have appeared in Romanian literature since at least the 16th century. The bucium was traditionally used by mountain dwellers, by the military for signals, and by shepherds for communication in the forested mountains and guiding sheep and dogs. It has also been played at funerals.

Trâmbița (from the old Germanic trumba, "to trumpet") produces sounds altogether different from those of the alphorn.

Under the name trembita it is also used by the Ukrainian Hutsuls and the Polish Gorals.

== See also ==
- Erke
