= Romanian traditional music =

Romanian authentic folk music

Romanian traditional music Romanian: muzica populară românească
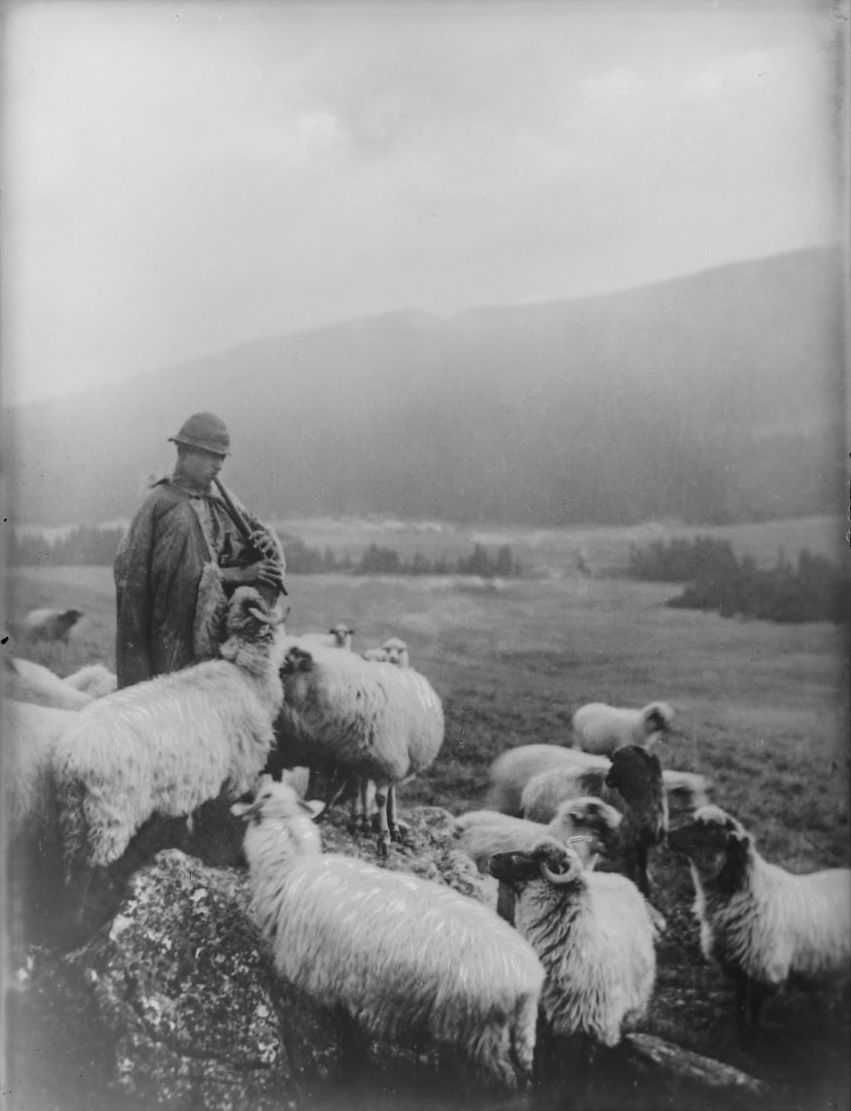
- Romanian shepherd with a fluier, 1930
- Stylistic origins: Folk music
- Cultural origins: Moldavia; Transylvania; Wallachia
- Typical instruments: fluier; bucium; cimpoi; folk violin; cobza; nai; cimbalom; accordion; buhai; tobă (drum); drâmbă; taragot; folk guitar; brass instruments

Subgenres
- bocet; doina; doina cu noduri; colindă; lăutărească music; hăulit; songs to the dead

Regional scenes
- Romania; Republic of Moldova

Romanian traditional music (Romanian: muzica populară românească) comprises the musical traditions of the Romanian ethnos, widespread in Romania, the Republic of Moldova, and in adjacent ethnographic areas. (Note: Including Northern Bukovina, Ukrainian Zakarpattia, the Budjak, the Serbian Banat, and the Timok Valley.) It is a complex cultural formation that combines archaic autochthonous elements, features shared with the Balkan and Carpathian areas, oriental borrowings, and later influences from urban and Western European musical culture. Traditional music is characterised by syncretism (a close connection between melody, rhythm, text, and dance), oral transmission, and a high degree of variability: a musical work has no fixed form, but is re-created by the performer at the moment of performance.

A fundamental feature of Romanian musical culture is a historically formed dualism that divides it into two interrelated layers: peasant music and lăutărească music (professional). The peasant tradition, maintained by non-professional performers (shepherds, peasants), preserves the most archaic, ritual, and utilitarian genres – colinde, laments, shepherd signals – performed primarily in monodic style, both vocally and on the simplest instruments such as the fluier, bucium, and cimpoi. The lăutărească tradition is professional performance historically connected with closed clans of musicians (most often Romani) and oriented toward public performance for listeners and dancers. By forming ensembles (taraf), lăutari developed virtuoso instrumental music with elements of harmony and improvisation, using the violin, cobza, cimbalom, and the nai.

The genre system of Romanian folklore is diverse. Its foundations include the pastoral heritage of the Carpathian area, the lyrical improvised song doina (recognised as a masterpiece of UNESCO intangible heritage), epic ballads, and an extensive complex of calendar and family rites (wedding and funerary). The musical language combines archaic diatonic modes, Eastern chromatic melodic patterns, and later elements of the European major–minor system. Dance music, numbering in the thousands of local variants, is characterised by a developed rhythmic organisation, including the use of asymmetric rhythms (aksak). Despite overall stylistic unity, the musical culture shows marked regional differentiation – from the instrumental polyrhythms of Transylvania and Maramureș to the virtuoso violin style of Muntenia and Oltenia and the lyrical manner of Moldavia and Bukovina.

The study of Romanian folk music, begun in the 19th century by enthusiasts, took shape in the 20th century as an independent discipline thanks to the works of Béla Bartók and Constantin Brăiloiu, who laid the foundations for its systematic analysis (rhythmic systems, modal structures, principles of variability). In the contemporary era, traditional music continues to develop both in forms of authentic folklore and staged reconstruction, and in transformed urban and popular-music genres.

== Character and structure of folk music ==
Traditional music is part of a syncretic art in which melody, rhythm, poetic text, and dance are closely linked and mutually interdependent. In rural settings, music is rarely perceived as "pure art" meant for listening; instead, it is deeply functional and integrated into everyday life and into key moments of the human life cycle – from cradle to grave. Music accompanies calendar feasts, family rites (weddings, christenings, funerals), work processes (shepherding, harvesting), and leisure activities (evening gatherings, dancing). Within ritual contexts it fulfils magical, ceremonial, and social functions and is often a mandatory element without which the event loses its status (for example, funerary or wedding songs have a strictly defined place and time of performance).

Like any folklore culture, Romanian music is based on oral tradition rather than written fixation. Constantin Brăiloiu, one of the founders of Romanian ethnomusicology, described its performative nature as follows:

Folk melody has no tangible reality in itself; it truly exists only at the moment of performance – of singing or playing – and lives only through the will of its performer and in the manner intended by him. Creation and interpretation merge here… to a degree that musical practice founded on the written or printed page ignores entirely; and all researchers have been struck by the freedoms the folk performer takes with the melody performed, treating it as his own property (which it is, in fact, to a large extent).

— Constantin Brăiloiu, Esquisse d'une méthode de folklore musical, (Brăiloiu 1931, pp. 241–242)

Original (French)

La mélodie populaire n'a aucune réalité palpable par elle-même. Elle n'existe réellement qu'au moment où on la chante ou la joue et ne vit que par la volonté de son interprète et de la manière voulue par lui. Création et interprétation se confondent ici... dans une mesure que la pratique musicale fondée sur l'écrit ou l'imprimé ignore absolument, et tous les chercheurs ont été frappés des libertés que l'exécutant populaire prend avec la mélodie exécutée qu'il traite comme son bien propre (ce qu'elle est, en effet, pour une large part).

According to Brăiloiu, oral tradition lacks the concept of a fixed "original"; instead, the performer's mind contains a "latent archetype" – a structural model on the basis of which musical form is created "here and now". This accounts for the high degree of variability: the same piece may change depending on the performer, the region, or the concrete situation, while still remaining within stable canons of tradition.

=== Regional stylistics and dialects ===
Despite the overall stylistic unity of Romanian folklore, researchers (notably Béla Bartók and Constantin Brăiloiu) distinguish clear musical dialects within it, whose boundaries often coincide with historical provinces.

Comparative characteristics of musical dialects
Region	Melody and rhythm	Modal basis	Strophic structure and form	Performance features
Central Transylvania	Predominantly syllabic rhythm (one syllable – one note).	Modes with a pentatonic substrate (five-step pitch collections without semitones) or pure diatonic organisation (seven-step systems of whole tones and semitones).	Four-line structures (AABB, AAcBB, AABBc, AAcBBc (Note: A and B denote the principal melodic lines; different letters indicate differences in the melodic contour of phrases. c is a short melodic insertion or refrain, often interjectional in character. It does not form an independent line but supplements and expands the strophic structure.)).	Use of apocope (elision of the final vowel). Developed dance suites.
Bihor	Richly ornamented melody; parlando rubato rhythm.	Lydian mode (with a characteristic augmented fourth).	Three-line structures are common (AAA, AAB, ABB).	Characteristic melodic ending (cadence) on the low seventh degree – a pitch a whole tone below the tonic.
Maramureș, Țara Oașului	Sustained melodies with long, uninterrupted phrases. Song rhythm is often iambic.	Archaic pentatonic and pre-pentatonic (primary modal formations with a small number of degrees) structures.	Short couplets of 2–4 lines and short vocal insertions, often without semantic text.	"Knotting" singing technique (doina cu noduri; horea cu noduri). Shouted ţâpurituri.
Banat	Syncopated rhythmic structures; high mobility.	Predominantly diatonic organisation, with a noticeable influence of the major–minor system.	"Refrain dialect" (the refrain is the central element and often exceeds the main stanza in length and complexity).	Influence of wind instruments (taragot) on vocal style.
Moldavia, Bukovina	Restrained melodic style; rhythm more often giusto syllabic.	Frequent use of half cadences on the second degree.	Recto tono recitation (on a single pitch) is common.	Use of the bucium for funerary signals. A specific style of cobza playing.
Muntenia, Oltenia	Abundant melismatic writing; predominance of parlando rubato.	Chromatic modes with an augmented second; influence of oriental music.	Developed forms of ballads and doina (cântec lung).	High virtuosity (lăutari style). Playing on the caval. Hăulit technique in the foothills of Oltenia.
Dobruja	Dominance of asymmetric rhythms (aksak).	Chromatic and diatonic Balkan-type modes.	Influence of Bulgarian and Turkish music.	Playing on the cimpoi and the Bulgarian kaval.

=== Dualism of the tradition: amateur and professional music ===
In traditional Romanian culture, two musical systems coexist and interact, differing not only in repertoire but also in social function, mode of transmission, and aesthetics. Shepherd and peasant music belong to an archaic stratum closely linked to everyday life. It is functional music, performed by members of the community "for themselves" or within ritual practice, without payment. It is characterized by the predominance of monody and the use of simple local instruments (fluier, bucium, cimpoi). Lăutărească music is a professional tradition, formed as a courtly and urban alternative to rural culture. It is music as a service and of public performance, performed for remuneration at weddings and other festivities. Unlike peasant monody, it is always ensemble-based, uses more complex instruments (folk violin, cobza, cimbalom), and is marked by high technical virtuosity and openness to external influences.

Lăutari often rework the shepherd repertoire, giving it greater expressiveness and technical complexity: thus, the ballad Miorița is performed by a shepherd as a simple carol, whereas in the lăutari milieu it acquires the form of a complex ornamented song. Genres that arose in the shepherd environment could, over time, pass into the sphere of professional lăutărească music – for example, dance and wedding repertoire.

=== Musical language: meter, rhythm, mode ===
The metric system of Romanian musical folklore is closely linked to the structure of folk poetry, which determines the symmetry and internal division of musical phrases. Two types of verse underlie most vocal and dance genres: the ancient six-syllable line (hexasyllabic), typical of archaic ritual songs and "old-style" ballads, and the more widespread eight-syllable line (octosyllabic). Lines are usually rhymed by assonance (vowel resonance), forming a continuous sequence without stanzas; classical consonant rhyme is often absent.

The organization of syllables in singing is governed by a metric accent, which groups them into pairs, falling invariably on every second syllable (ŭ ú | ŭ ú | ŭ ú in the case of hexasyllabics, and ŭ ú | ŭ ú ŭ ú | ŭ ú in the case of octosyllabics). A characteristic feature of the tradition is the priority of musical meter over natural speech stress: in performance, lexical stress may shift in accordance with the rhythm of the melody. Their coincidence is most often observed only in the final pair of syllables of the line. Such flexibility makes it possible to use truncated (catalectic) verse forms of five or seven syllables, filling the missing metric beats by inserting auxiliary vowels or filler syllables ("u", "le", "re", "măi").

The interaction of text and melody is also regulated by devices such as apocope (truncation of a final vowel at the end of a line) and anacrusis (one or more unstressed syllables at the beginning of a line before the first stress). When the poetic line exceeds the musical phrase in length, the final syllable may be omitted, and the opening of the phrase is prepared by a short pickup – a tone before the first strong beat. Refrains play an important role; they may either reproduce the meter of the main verse (pseudo-refrains) or have their own structure. In the "old-style" tradition, such metric universality ensures a high degree of freedom: any text, for example in octosyllabic meter, can be spontaneously performed to any melody of the same meter.

The rhythmic organization of Romanian music includes several interrelated systems, each characteristic of a particular cultural stratum. The simplest is the children's rhythmic system (ritm de copii), based on the even alternation of identical note values (♩♩♩♩) and typical of counting rhymes and games. In ritual folklore, above all in carols, the syllabic system giusto syllabic predominates, in which durations are strictly correlated with the poetic text, usually in a 2:1 proportion (♪ ♪ ♪ ♪ |♩♩). Lyric genres such as the doina and the ballad rely on the improvisational system parlando rubato, in which meter is free and subordinated to breathing and expressive delivery. Dance music often uses aksak rhythms – asymmetric structures built on alternations of two- and three-beat units, for example: ♪ ♪ |♪ ♪ |♪ ♪ | ♩♩♩. A fifth system is divisive giusto, (Note: The term refers to the classification of Curt Sachs, who contrasted "divisive" rhythms (division) with "additive" rhythms (addition of primary durations), characteristic of many folk systems, including aksak.) typical of later folklore and urban genres with an even metric pulse (for example: ♩ ♩ ♩ ♩).

Professional lăutări performance is characterized by micro-rhythmic deviations and deliberate metric instability, creating an effect of inner tension that is difficult to convey accurately by means of standard notation.

The modal system of Romanian folklore rests on several models. The most archaic stratum includes pentatonic structures, represented both in a full anhemitonic form (without semitones) and in earlier variants with omitted degrees. These structures are especially well preserved in the music of Transylvania and in children's folklore. Another characteristic model is the "unstable mode" (modul nesigur), marked by the intonational mobility of particular degrees that vary depending on melodic context. The development of these forms led to a diatonic system in which Dorian, Phrygian, and Mixolydian modes predominate. In some regions, specific preferences persist, for example the Lydian mode in Bihor. These diatonic structures form the basis of most peasant song and dance genres.

A more complex modal organization is characteristic of the professional lăutări tradition, where elements of Western European harmony combine with principles of Oriental maqam practice. It employs chromatic modes with an augmented second, as well as non-tempered intonation, in which the pitch of degrees varies to intensify expressiveness. These features are supported by the heterophonic character of ensemble performance, in which participants reproduce slightly differing variants of the same melody.

An important stylistic element, especially in instrumental performance, is developed ornamentation. It includes mordents, trills, glissando and other devices, which function not as external embellishments but as an integral part of melodic development. In the lăutări tradition, ornamentation serves as a means of individualizing performance and as an indicator of virtuosity. The combination of non-tempered tuning, complex syllabic structure, and rich melismatic practice forms the distinctive stylistic character of Romanian folk music.

== Shepherd music ==
- Shepherd music
- Bucium – Alexandru Găină (Moldova)
- Când şi-a pierdut ciobanul oile – Alexandru Găină, "When the shepherd lost his sheep" (Moldova)
- Când şi-a pierdut ciobanul oile – Neculai Taftă, 1956, "When the shepherd lost his sheep" (Moldova)

Shepherding (sheep breeding) played an important role in the formation of the Romanian people, shaping features of lifestyle and culture. The musical stratum associated with shepherding is considered one of the most ancient and autonomous, since under conditions of relative isolation of mountain shepherd communities it preserved many archaic traits.

In the shepherd milieu, music performs primarily utilitarian tasks: it serves as a means of herding management, a way of communication over long distances, an instrument of magical protection, and a form of interaction between shepherds and animals. Musical instruments and their associated repertoire are functionally correlated with specific stages and actions of shepherd life. Shepherd music includes several functionally and generically distinct subtypes: signals of the shepherd's horn (bucium), road melodies (șireaguri, cântări de drum), pasture melodies (cântări de plai, literally – tunes of the plai (Note: Plai (Romanian: plai) – mountain meadow (cf. Polonyna). (dexonline.ro/Plai))), and program pieces with a narrative plot reflecting events of shepherd life. A separate place is occupied by shepherd vocal signaling, represented by the form hăulit.

The sphere of influence of Romanian shepherd music covers a significant part of Central and South-Eastern Europe. Migrations of the Vlach population in the 13th–14th centuries and the development of transhumance pastoralism contributed to the formation of a common Carpathian shepherd culture. Settlements organized under "Vlach law" (Latin: jus valachicum) spread among Slavic peoples – in Galicia, Slovakia, the Polish Podhale, and Moravian Wallachia – where the ethnonym "Vlach" eventually came to denote the profession of shepherd.

=== Functional signals ===
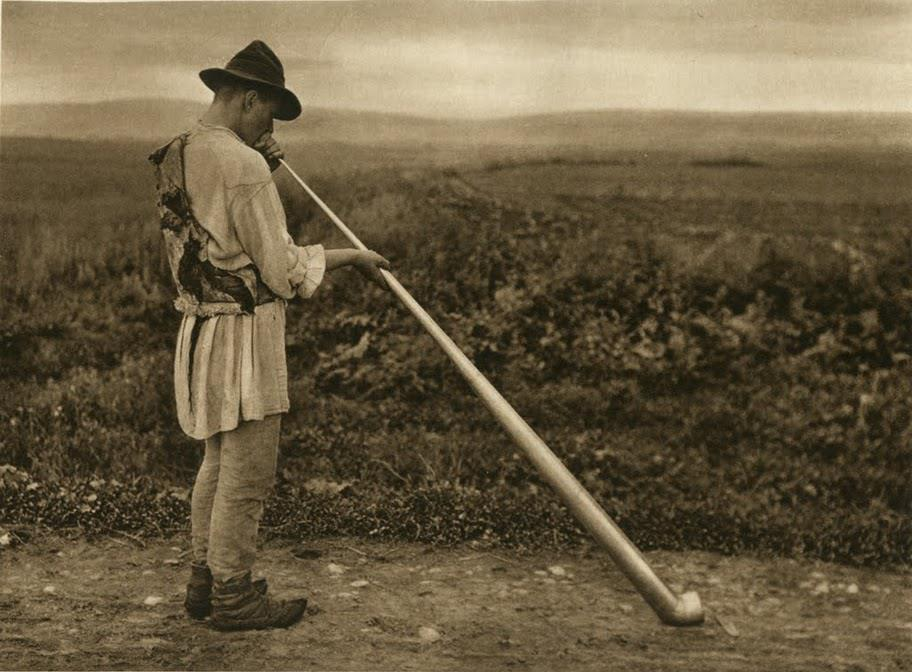
A buciumaș (performer on the bucium). Photograph by Kurt Hielscher (1933)

To transmit messages over long distances, a developed system of motifs performed on the bucium is used. There are distinct signals for different stages of work: "Gathering the sheep" (Romanian: Adunarea oilor), "Setting out" (Porneala), "Milking" (La muls), and "Dividing the sheep" (Răscolul). The signal "Return" (Întorsul) is used to direct dogs that bring straying sheep back to the flock.

=== Road and pasture melodies ===
Grazing, soothing animals, and their magical protection are traditionally associated with the fluier. Shepherds perform road melodies while traveling for orientation and for managing the flock. Such tunes guide sheep toward pasture and help keep them together, especially at night. The shepherd, playing the fluier, walks ahead, and the flock follows him. Although these melodies go back to bucium signals, road tunes have a more developed structure and a more lyrical character, due to the technical possibilities of the fluier. To acoustically fill open space, performance is often accompanied by a guttural drone (ison gutural), creating a dense sonic texture.

Pasture melodies are tunes performed on pastures (on the plai), predominantly in the morning at sunrise. They are connected with magical and protective tasks – an acoustic address to the deity of light, symbolizing life, abundance, and fertility. Playing the fluier is attributed with the ability to improve milk yield and to protect the flock from evil spirits and predators.

Alongside the fluier, the cimpoi also played an important role in interaction with the flock, since its continuous drone polyphony creates a stable sonic background. This constant presence of sound likewise has a calming effect on sheep, especially during rest periods or prolonged stays in one place. Skills of playing the cimpoi were transmitted from older shepherds to younger ones directly during grazing.

=== Vocal signals: hăulit ===
A special vocal technique in the shepherd milieu, widespread in Oltenia in the Carpathian foothills, is hăulit. It is a powerful vocal signal in a high register, performed using falsetto and abrupt register shifts, reminiscent of Alpine yodel practice. The hăulit tradition is associated with the spring awakening of nature and the beginning of the shepherding season (St George's Day). Hăulit can be performed independently – as a means of long-distance communication or an expression of joy – but can also be embedded into the melody of a doina (doină cu hăulit) or accompany playing on the fifă – an archaic variety of stopped fluier traditionally played by women.

=== Program music ===
One of the best-known shepherd programmatic pieces is the poem "When the shepherd lost his sheep". The musical form of the work is based on a sharp contrast of tempi and rhythms: the grief of loss is conveyed by an extended doina-type melody in free rubato rhythm, while the joy of finding the flock and the finale are presented by lively dance tunes in clear giusto rhythm. Traditionally the piece is performed on shepherd instruments – the fluier or the cimpoi. This plot is known in the Romanian area at least since the 16th century and is also found among neighboring peoples (Hungarians, Slovaks, Ukrainians), which is linked to Vlach shepherd migrations.

Another musical narrative is "The Story of Tânjală" (Povestea lui Tânjală). Its plot tells of a shepherd who, having lost his fluier, carved a new instrument from a stolen tânjală (the shaft of a yoke) taken from ploughmen, and was acquitted by a judge thanks to his mastery of playing. The performance takes the form of a suite in which narration alternates with musical illustrations: shepherd songs, doinas (for example Doina lui Tânjală), and dance tunes performed on the fluier.

The ballad Miorița, which arose in the shepherd milieu and belongs to the epic genre, occupies an important place in Romanian culture. The plot of a shepherd who accepts death as a cosmic wedding with nature reflects characteristic traits of the shepherd worldview. On the basis of this image, the philosopher Lucian Blaga formulated the concept of the Mioritic space, describing a particular mode of perceiving the world connected to the rhythm of the Carpathian landscape – "hill – valley" (Romanian: deal – vale). In Blaga's view, this same rhythm of alternating elevations and lowlands is reflected in music as well, above all in the melodic structure of the doina. Despite wider circulation in the form of a lăutari ballad, the plot of a shepherd who learns from a ewe of his impending death and accepts it as an inevitable part of fate is also recorded in Transylvania in the genre of the colindă, linked to a more archaic shepherd ritual context.

== Ritual folklore ==
This musical stratum is among the most ancient and conservative in Romanian culture. It has a clearly expressed practical function and is closely tied to customs aimed at the well-being of the community and the maintenance of harmony with nature. Ritual folklore is associated with key moments of the calendar year and with stages of the human life cycle (birth, wedding, death). In these forms, music, poetry, and dance are integrated and subordinated to a shared social and magical purpose, functioning as a means of symbolic influence on the world.

=== Winter cycle ===
- Calendar customs
- Men's group Colindat, Christmas-time ritual (UNESCO), colinde
- Ostrovel de mare, Colindă "de băiat mic", colindă (Muntenia, 1957)
- Zicala Dobei & Leușoru ș-o tunat (Colindă de june), colindă (Hunedoara, 1956)
- Jocul caprelor – Ansamblu Ca La Noi, Capra ("Goat") (Moldova)
- Capra din Mălini, Capra ("Goat") (Bukovina)
- Turca – Gheorghe Stoica et al., Turca (Transylvania)
- Capra, Capra ("Goat") (Bukovina)
- Jocul caprei – Alexandru Găină et al., Capra ("Goat") (Moldova)
- Pluguşorul – Sidor Andronicescu, Ilie Cazacu et al., Plugușorul (Bukovina, 1956)

A central place in the winter ritual cycle is occupied by colinde (Romanian: colinde; cf. Carol) – ritual songs performed by organized groups of carolers (cete de colindători) in the period from Christmas to Epiphany. Although today they are associated with Christian feasts, their origins are linked to the Roman Saturnalia and to earlier cults of the winter solstice. Caroling takes the form of a ritual visitation of households, during which performers sing songs of blessing addressed to the hosts and receive symbolic gifts in return (bread, treats, money). The ritual is oriented toward ensuring health, fertility, and communal well-being in the coming year. Regional practice varies in the composition of the groups: they may consist of children, young men, young women, adults, or mixed groups. Colinde may be addressed to specific categories of people – unmarried girls, unmarried young men, newly married couples, or representatives of particular occupations (for example hunters or shepherds).

Colinde are not distributed uniformly. In Moldova, Oltenia, and the southern Banat, the practice of caroling is recorded comparatively rarely. The musical style of colinde also differs substantially: the most distinctive and apparently most archaic forms are noted by researchers in southern Transylvania (especially in Hunedoara), in south-eastern Muntenia (the counties of Ilfov, Ialomița, Brăila), and in Dobruja.

By theme, the colinde repertoire is conventionally divided into two strata: secular and religious. Secular colinde are regarded as the most archaic; their texts are not directly tied to Christmas and instead focus on heroic myths (for example a hero fighting a lion or hunting a stag), as well as on motifs of fertility, household prosperity, and marital choice. The principal function of these songs is a magical wish for health and well-being. Religious colinde form a kind of "folk Bible" based on apocryphal plots, in which God and the saints are depicted as simple peasants or shepherds (for example an aged God herding sheep and playing the fluier).

Colinde are characterized by the giusto syllabic rhythm – a strict correspondence between rhythm and the syllabic structure of the text. In many regions, colinde are performed antiphonally: the group divides into two parts that sing alternately; the next subgroup often enters before the previous one has finished, so that the performance becomes locally two-voiced. The melodies are laconic and are often built on archaic three- or four-degree modes, i.e., narrow-range pitch sets. In Hunedoara, colinde are accompanied by the rhythmic accompaniment of a small drum – duba, which gives the performance a strongly dynamic character.

Alongside the colinde, so-called "songs with the star" (cântece de stea; cf. Star singers) circulate in the winter period. They are performed by children who go from house to house carrying a decorated star made of paper or cardboard, sometimes lit from within; it symbolizes the Star of Bethlehem. "Songs with the star" do not belong to the folk colinde repertoire proper. The genre arose in a para-church environment as an alternative to colinde, which in early sources were often condemned as irreverent. These songs draw on biblical and apocryphal narratives as well as on Western European Christmas songs, and only partially entered the oral tradition. They are characterized by bookish language, simplified imagery, and a different poetic-metrical organization from that of traditional colinde.

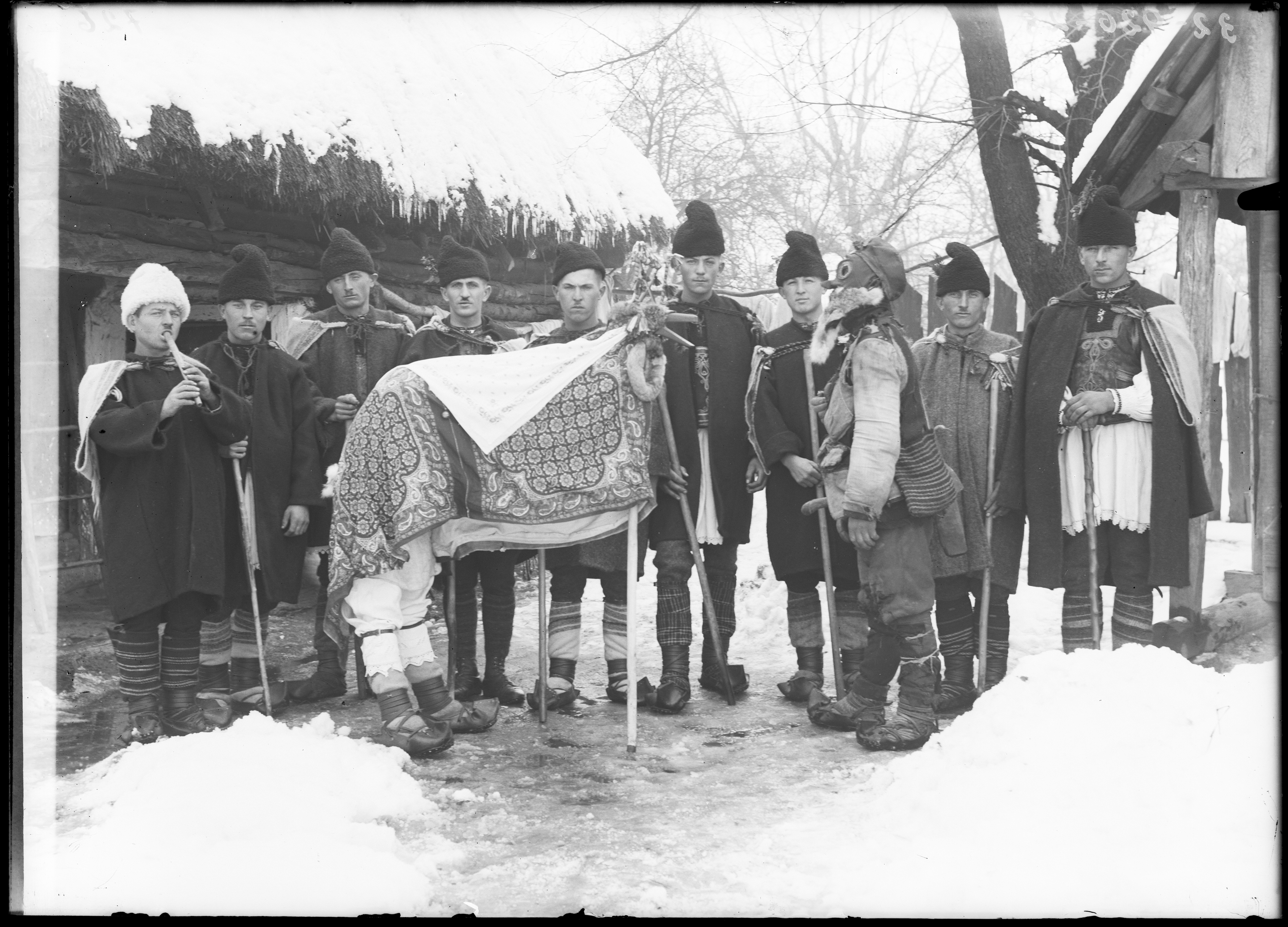
Capra (Deer), Hunedoara (photo by Romulus Vuia, 1926)

A separate group of winter rituals, associated with the transition to the New Year (the eve and the first days of January), is formed by theatricalized masked performances with zoomorphic characters. Among the most widespread are the games with the mask of the goat – Capra, the Bear (Ursul; cf. Leading the bear), as well as their regional variants: Brezaia in Muntenia, Turca or Țurca in Transylvania, and Deer (Cerbul, Cerbuțul) in Banat and Hunedoara. These images go back to ancient ideas of fertility and the renewal of nature and are realized in the form of street processions and pantomimic scenes with dance, noise effects, and elements of comic theater.

The central element of the performance is an animal mask with a movable lower jaw, made of wooden plates and operated by the performer. The rhythmic clacking of the jaws (clămpănitul), essentially a primitive idiophone, is combined with the ringing of small bells and jingle bells (zurgălăi) that decorate the costume. In some regions, the masked character leans on a staff with which the dance rhythm is beaten out.

Concrete forms of the ritual vary considerably from region to region. In Transylvania and Muntenia, masked games sometimes include colinde (colind de turcă or colind de brezaie). In northern Moldova and Bukovina, where such processions are known as Malanca (cf. Malanka), the masked parades are especially large-scale and include numerous characters (shepherds, traders, old men, Roma, a "bear" with a handler-"ursar", groups of "horsemen" (căiuți), (Note: Participants in a masked procession who perform a dance in which the costume imitates a rider on a horse.) etc.), as well as an instrumental ensemble. These performances are characterized by a dense noisy and musical soundscape: drums (tobă), the buhai, bucium, fluiers, cimpoi, cowbells (talancă), whips, and horns are used. The abundance of loud sound is interpreted as a means of driving away evil forces and as a symbolic greeting of the New Year.

The agrarian New Year ritual Plugușorul (transl. little plough) is a ritual house-to-house visitation widespread in Muntenia, Moldova, and Bukovina and performed on New Year's Eve and on the first day of the New Year. It is carried out by groups of children or men who, carrying a symbolic plough, recite wishes for prosperity in a chant-like manner. The main ritual instrument is the buhai – a friction drum with a bundle of horsehair, whose muffled sound imitates the bellow of an ox. Alongside it, noise instruments are used – bells and shepherd whips (harapnic), and in some cases the fluier.

=== Spring–summer cycle (agrarian customs) ===
- Spring–summer customs
- Păpărudele, Muntenia
- Păpărudele, Oltenia, 1938
- Paparuda, Moldova
- Drăgaica, Maramureș
- Căluş, 1967
- The Căluş Ritual (UNESCO)

Rituals of the spring–summer cycle are connected with the awakening of nature and the main stages of agricultural work. Unlike winter festivities, oriented primarily toward the well-being of the household and family, these rites are directed toward interaction with natural forces: ensuring the fertility of the fields, calling rain during drought, and providing magical protection for the harvest. These customs preserve pronounced archaic features and go back to pre-Christian ideas associated with solar cults and agrarian magic.

Paparuda (also Păpăluga, Păpăruga, Dodoloaia, Blojul) is an ancient rain-calling ritual performed during drought. It was first described by Dimitrie Cantemir in the Descriptio Moldaviae. The ritual is carried out by groups of girls or children adorned with fresh greenery, who go from yard to yard singing and dancing while the householders pour water over them, symbolizing rain. The Paparuda melody is simple and archaic, built on narrow-range pitch sets; in Muntenia it often has an asymmetric aksak rhythm (the geampara type), while in Banat it is syllabic or mixed in rhythm.

Caloian (also Scaloian, Ene, Ududoi) is an agrarian ritual of symbolic burial of a clay doll, intended either to call rain or to stop excessive rainfall. Children mold one or two dolls, decorate them with flowers and candles, then stage a burial with parodic laments and set the doll afloat or bury it near a spring. In some regions a male and a female figure are distinguished ("Father Sun" and "Mother Rain"). The musical component of the rite is linked to tunes close to funeral lamentations and other archaic ritual forms.

Drăgaica is a summer ritual performed on 24 June, on the day of Sânziene, a feast of the summer solstice (cf. Kupala Night). It is connected with the ripening of the harvest and, in Dimitrie Cantemir's interpretation, goes back to the cult of Ceres. In the second half of the 20th century the rite persisted in southern Muntenia. The participants – girls in white clothing decorated with ears of grain – select the "Drăgaica" (the ritual bride) and the "Drăgan" (a girl dressed as a young man). Under the leadership of the Drăgan, who carries a ritual banner (a pole with a cloth doll decorated with wheat ears, wormwood, and garlic), the procession goes around fields and yards, performing a circle dance without hand-holding, with shouts and whistling. In a number of places the rite is also accompanied by playing on shepherd instruments, above all the fluier or the cimpoi.

Căluș is an archaic ritual complex included in UNESCO's list of masterpieces of the cultural heritage of humanity. It is performed during the period of Rusalii (Trinity week), when, according to folk belief, supernatural beings (iele) are especially active. The male brotherhood of călușari, characterized by strict discipline and ritual closure, performs virtuosic stick dances. Rhythm is created by movement, by the ringing of spurs, and by bells fastened to the dancers' legs. Music performed by a violinist and a cobza player or a cimbalom player plays an important role in the ritual and is endowed in folk consciousness with healing power.

=== Wedding music ===
- Wedding music
- Noi aicea am venit – Ansamblul "Ciprian Porumbescu", wedding song (Bukovina, 1978)
- Fecioresc de nuntă – Gheorghe Covaci-Cioată, wedding dance (Maramureș)
- Melodie de nuntă – Ștefan Barbu Calonfir, wedding melody (Muntenia)
- Miresuica cu cununa – Maria Petca-Poptean, wedding song (Oaș, 2010)
- Jocul vătăjeilor – Orchestra George Sârbu, wedding dance (Bukovina)
- Inhobotatul miresei – Fanfare "Zece Prăjini", wedding music (Moldova)
- Cântecul miresei – Nicolae Nemeș Munteanu, bride's song (Banat)
- La broboditul miresei – Silvestru Lungoci, song for dressing the bride (Bukovina)
- Dezlegarea miresei – Orchestra ansamblului Ciprian Porumbescu, (Bukovina)
- Jalea miresei – Alexandru Havriliuc, (Bukovina, 1978)
- Cântec de nuntă – Mihai Botofei, wedding song (Moldova)

The wedding is a multi-stage "rite of passage" (rit de trecere), lasting several days (usually beginning on Saturday or Sunday). Music in the wedding marks transitions between episodes, organizes the movement of processions, supports dancing and feasting, and also reproduces farewell and lament motifs. In Transylvania, wedding songs are traditionally performed by the participants of the rite themselves (most often groups of women), whereas in Muntenia, Oltenia, Moldova, and Bukovina this function has almost entirely passed to professional lăutari, who accompany each stage of the ceremony.

Each episode of the wedding usually has its own melody. The rite of decorating the wedding tree, symbolizing life force and renewal, is in most regions marked by the performance of the "Song of the fir" (Cântecul bradului) or the "Hora of the fir" (Hora bradului). The ritual shaving of the groom on Sunday morning, symbolizing farewell to bachelor life in Oltenia, Muntenia, Dobruja, and southern Moldova, includes the performance of a special "Groom's song" (Cântecul mirelui, La bărbierit), usually sustained in a restrained melancholic tone; in other regions this genre is encountered more rarely.

The central dramatic moment of the wedding rite is the bride's farewell to the parental home. A key role here is played by the "Bride's song" (Cântecul miresei, in Transylvania also Goghie), whose text reflects motifs of parting and transition into another kin group ("yesterday I was with the girls, and today with the married women"). The musical realization of this lament varies by region: in Moldova and northern Transylvania it is often sung to a doina melody; in Muntenia and Oltenia lăutari treat it in a free improvisatory manner with developed melismatics; in Bukovina and northern Moldova an instrumental version is performed on violin or trumpet, known as the "Bride's sorrow" (Jalea miresei).

During processions and transitions, musicians perform marches and dance tunes. In Transylvania, participants in the procession add rhythmic shouts (strigături). On the banner (steag), which replaces the wedding tree in some areas of Transylvania, bells and jingle bells are hung; they ring when the standard-bearer shakes the pole.

During the main feast (masa mare) in Muntenia and Oltenia, lăutari entertain guests by performing music "for listening" (de ascultare), toast pieces (de pahar), and epic ballads, especially characteristic of southern Romania. The rite of the "Chicken dance" (Jocul găinii) is widespread and is enacted during the main feast: a cook brings a roasted chicken decorated with flowers before the godparents. In Transylvania, she shouts humorous couplets (strigături) before the ceremonial father to the melody of Haţegana or another lively dance tune. In some regions, this episode may include elements of comic bargaining or a symbolic payment.

In Muntenia and Oltenia, the central ritual dance is the solemn "Great hora" (Hora mare, also Nuneasca), performed in honor of the ceremonial parents. Another widely spread dance is Jocul miresei (also Cînd joacă mireasa în bani), when guests in turn dance with the bride and present her with money. In Bukovina, wedding dances Busuiocul, Hohotul, Jocul zestrei, and De trei ori pe după masă are popular.

=== Funeral music ===
- Funeral music
- Bocet – Leontina Niga, Trifanuca Nemciuc, bocet (Bukovina, 1937)
- Vămurile – Polina Popescu, bocet (Oltenia, 1940)
- Vaiet la frate – Maria Arbagic, bocet (Oltenia, 1933)
- Zorile – Ioana Schiau, Cristina Pavel, Marița Grama, Song of the Zori (Oltenia, 1939)
- Zorile de la amiază – Lena Preda & Ilca Lepăduș, Song of the Zori (Banat, 1940)
- Bradul – Maria Tărfăloagă & Maria Mojnean, Song of the fir (Oltenia, 1937)

Music of the funeral rite is among the most stable elements of traditional culture. Two main genres can be distinguished within it: lamentation and ceremonial songs. The lament, or Romanian: bocet (variants: vaiet; vămurile in Oltenia), consists of individual lamentations improvised by a woman performer – either a professional mourner (bocitoare) or a close female relative of the deceased. It is an emotional response to loss, conveying personal grief and often interrupted by sobbing. The singing is close to recitative, the form is free, and melodic models differ markedly by region.

Ceremonial songs (cântece ceremoniale), unlike the bocet, are performed by a group of women (not closely related to the deceased) and play primarily a ritual rather than an emotional role. The best known is the "Song of the Dawns" (Cântecul Zorilor), which addresses the dawn with a request not to come too quickly, so that the "traveler" may have time to prepare for the journey. The "Song of the Fir Tree" (Cântecul bradului) is also widespread; it is performed at the funerals of unmarried young people and is interpreted as a symbolic "wedding with nature".

In mountain areas (Bukovina, Maramureș, the region of Vrancea), the funeral rite may be accompanied by instrumental music – signals of bucium horns or playing on fluiers, whose sound imitates crying or expresses sorrow (de jale). In Bukovina, a large fluier is sometimes used to accompany the bocet as well. In Moldova, lăutari may perform "songs of parting" (de petrecanie).

== Epic genre: ballad ==
- Ballads
- Miorița – Alexandru Cercel, lăutar ballad (Muntenia, 1957)
- Vișina – Mihai Căpățână, lăutar ballad (Muntenia)
- Balada Conducătorului –Nicolae Neacșu (Taraf de Haidouks), lăutar ballad (Muntenia, 1993)
- Soarele şi Luna – Mitică Burcea, Ion Păturică, lăutar ballad (Muntenia, 1951)
- Novac (fragment) – Mitică Burcea, Ion Păturică, lăutar ballad (Muntenia)

The epic song known in folk usage as the "old song" (cântec bătrânesc) is a narrative genre devoted to mythological, heroic, or social-domestic events. The term "ballad" (baladă) is of learned origin: it was introduced into scholarly and cultural usage by the poet Vasile Alecsandri in the mid-19th century and over time displaced the folk designation. The genre developed in the shepherd milieu as part of ritual and everyday life, but was later adopted by professional musicians – lăutari – who transformed it into a virtuoso form of performance art. Depending on the region, the ballad continues to exist in both forms: as an element of peasant tradition and as a professional genre.

=== Shepherd tradition ===
In Transylvania, Bukovina, and northern Moldova, the epic song has been preserved chiefly in non-professional settings. Shepherds and peasants perform songs at festivities and family gatherings. Singing may be accompanied by playing on simple shepherd instruments – the fluier and the cimpoi. Epic texts are usually sung to the melodies of strophic songs or doine; in some regions, especially in Transylvania, they are also sung to colinde melodies. Consequently, local variants of the epic song are generally shorter: they lack an extended recitative and do not have a composition built on a sequence of episodes. The best-known ballad of the shepherd circle is Miorița. In the shepherd milieu it is encountered both as a song and as a colindă.

=== Lăutari tradition ===
In Muntenia, Oltenia, and southern Moldova, the epic genre has been preserved primarily in the lăutari milieu. In the 20th century, the classical lăutari form of the ballad was maintained chiefly by professional lăutari, whereas in the shepherd milieu epic texts more often circulate in abbreviated and fragmentary form. In lăutari practice, ballads belong to a repertoire intended for attentive listening and require high performance skill and a well-developed memory. They are performed at listeners' request at weddings (most often during the main feast – masa mare, after midnight), at christenings, and at fairs; in the banquet context such songs are usually addressed to older participants. In the past such ballads could be performed for several hours; in modern practice their duration usually does not exceed 15–20 minutes.

As a rule, the performer accompanies himself on violin or cobza or appears with a taraf. The instrumental part plays an active role in musical development: it not only supports the vocal line but also structures the narrative, emphasizes dramatic moments, and fills pauses between stanzas. The classical performance form recorded in the first half of the 20th century included an instrumental prelude taqsim (taxîm), an alternation of vocal episodes with instrumental interludes, and a concluding section, often in the form of a dance tune, returning listeners to the festive context. In the second half of the 20th century this structure gradually simplified: the taqsim, dance insertions, and lyrical episodes are often omitted, and the number of narrative episodes is reduced.

The musical form of the lăutari ballad is not fixed and is shaped in performance, following the development of the plot. The principal expressive means is epic recitative (recitativ epic), which in its classical form includes several techniques:

- recto tono – recitative on a single pitch, used for rapid narration of events;
- melodic recitative: short melodic turns organized around modal support tones;
- parlato (Romanian: băsmit): half-speech/half-song used at climactic dramatic moments. The presence of parlato distinguishes the classical ballad from abbreviated and later epic forms found in other regions.

=== Themes ===
Ballad repertoire displays considerable thematic diversity and, according to the classical systematization of the Romanian musicologist Alexandru Amzulescu, is divided into six principal cycles:

- mythological ballads (fantastic) – plots preserving echoes of ancient cosmogonic myths: stories of transformations of celestial bodies ("Sun and Moon" – Soarele și Luna), personifications of natural forces ("Frost" – Gerul), and battles with mythic beings (the Serpent – Șarpele, Iovan Iorgovan);
- heroic ballads – the most extensive cycle, including songs about resistance to invaders (Gruia Novac, Chira Chiralina), stories of heroes, and above all the haiduc epic – the core of the lăutari repertoire – devoted to noble outlaws (Pintea the Brave, Toma Alimoș, Iancu Jianu, or Corbea);
- shepherd ballads, including not only "Miorița" but also plots about the woman shepherd Șalga, reflecting the dangers and features of pastoral life;
- ballads about the feudal court, connected with the lives of rulers; the best known is the legend of Meșterul Manole and the human sacrifice for the strength of the walls of the Argeș monastery;
- dramas of private life, from unhappy love to family conflict (plots about a sold wife or an evil mother-in-law), forming the cycle of family ballads;
- oral chronicles (jurnale orale) – a late genre recording real tragic events of the recent past, such as the peasant uprising of 1907 or local catastrophes.

== Lyric genres (non-ritual) ==
- Doine and lyric songs
- Doina (UNESCO)
- Doina: Izvoraș cu apă rece – Leontina Niga, doina (Bukovina, 1937)
- Mândră floare-i norocu – Maria Surpat (Surupat), doina (Bukovina, 1937)
- Doină: De săracu mândruţu – Maria Pop, doina with "knots" (Oaș, 1940)
- Doina – Trifanuca Nemciuc, doina, large fipple-less fluier (Bukovina, 1937)
- Doina – Grigore Nistor, doina, large fipple-less fluier (Bukovina, 1969)
- Nu dǎ Doamne nimǎnui, song (Transylvania, 1964)
- Maria Lătărețu – Hăulita din Gorj, song with hăulit (Gorj, 1960)
- Cântec de leagǎn, lullaby (Transylvania, 1933–1943)

In addition to shepherd, ritual, and dance practice, folk music was widely used in everyday life – in domestic settings, during leisure, individually or in a small circle. Such music served as a means of personal expression of feelings, reflections, and experiences, without being tied to a specific custom or calendar event. It is precisely in this extra-ritual context that the main body of the non-ritual vocal repertoire took shape, oriented toward individual or chamber performance.

Within non-ritual vocal music, two principal subgenres are distinguished: the free improvisational doina and the strophic song, differing in structure and principles of musical organization. This distinction goes back to Constantin Brăiloiu, who introduced the concepts of "doina proper" (doina propriu-zisă) and "song proper" (cântecul propriu-zis). The same poetic text may be performed either in doina form or in song form; the difference is determined by musical style and performance manner.

=== Doina ===
The doina is an emblematic genre of Romanian lyric expression, representing a free melodic improvisation. It conveys deep personal experiences such as grief, love, and alienation; a special place among them is occupied by the specific and difficult-to-translate concept Romanian: dor (from Latin: dolor – pain, suffering, sorrow). According to dictionary definitions, it combines longing for loved ones or for one's native home, inner pain, passion, inward striving, and amorous yearning. This emotional state finds musical expression in the doina's characteristic free, non-metrical parlando rubato rhythm, which allows the performer to vary tempo and note duration depending on the intensity of feeling. The structure of the doina has no fixed stanzas and is created anew each time by the performer through combining traditional melodic formulas. The free rhythm, together with developed ornamentation and the use of micro-intervals, makes it difficult to notate the doina accurately within the framework of classical staff notation without distortion.

The melodic material of doine is often based on diatonic modes (in particular Dorian with a variable fourth degree) or on narrow-range pitch sets (pre-pentatonic structures). Melodic development is achieved not by expanding the range but by intensive variation of neighboring tones. In the southern regions, under the influence of lăutari tradition, chromatic modes with an augmented second are widespread. Doine are characterized by an abundance of melismas, grace notes, and glissando. Performance often begins with an exclamation in the high register and gradually descends to the principal tone.

The doina has many regional folk names reflecting its musical features, the landscape or situational context of performance, and the character of the feeling: "hore lungă" (long doina), "cântec lung" (long song), "de lung" (long), "doină cu noduri" (doina with knots), hore cu noduri (doina with knots), "hore din grumaz" (throat doina), "ca pe plai" (as on the plai), "ca pe luncă" (as on the meadow), "ca pe coastă" (as on the slope), "ca la munte" (as in the mountains), "ca la câmp" (as in the field), "de codru" (forest), "de deal" (from the hill), "de ducă" (farewell), "de dragoste" (love), "de haiduc" (haiduc), "de jale" (sorrowful), and others. (Note: In the first decades of the 20th century, the term "doina" was used in village culture only as one of many designations for songs of this genre. Thus, for example, Constantin Brăiloiu recorded in 1930 the words of an informant from Gorj County (Oltenia): "Old people do not understand what a doina is. I understand because I know from books: a doina is a cântec lung ('long song')" (Kahane 2007, p. 17). Over time, middle-aged informants who had received schooling and participated in institutionalized forms of "folk culture" and amateur performance began to describe the doina as "the musical genre of a solitary person" or as a "special inner experience." In addition, under the influence of folklorism, mass media, and festival practices, they began to call "doine" most songs performed at a slow tempo, including those structured in regular syllabic rhythm (giusto syllabic), thereby blurring the boundary between the doina and other lyric genres (Secară 2010, p. 202).)

An archaic variety – the doina cu noduri (hore cu noduri or hore din grumaz), best known in Maramureș and Oaș – is characterized by the use of specific throat sounds resembling suppressed sobbing or hiccups, lending the music a high degree of dramatic intensity and an "instrumental" character. Such "knots" also occur in the foothill areas of Oltenia (especially in Gorj; doina cu noduri). In the same region (Gorj), another form is also widespread – the doina with hăulit (doină cu hăulit), in which the melody is interrupted by powerful, vibrating cries in the high register. In Bukovina and northern Moldova, old doine are often called "Bătrâneasca" (transl. Old-style); they are characterized by restrained ornamentation and the predominance of one-note recitative (recto tono), which brings them closer to the epic style. Although the doina is predominantly a vocal genre, its principles of performance and improvisational structure are also widely used in instrumental forms.

=== Lyric song ===
The lyric song is the most widespread and stable form of non-ritual vocal music. Unlike the doina, the "song proper" has a clear strophic structure and a regular rhythm (giusto). Older songs were generally based on six- or eight-syllable verse and modal scales. In the 20th century, under the influence of urban musical culture, a so-called new style (cântece de stil nou) developed, using the major–minor system, a wider range, and regular meter. The themes of lyric songs cover various aspects of life, including love, social protest, satire, and military service (cǎtǎnie).

=== Lullaby ===
Lullabies (Romanian: cântecul de leagăn) occupy an intermediate position between non-ritual lyric practice and ritual folklore. They are characterized by a simple form (usually a stanza of two to three phrases) and a slow tempo. The rhythm may be free or may have a characteristic "rocking" pulse, often iambic, correlated with the motion of the cradle. The repertoire of lullaby melodies proper is relatively small; in practice, melodies of doine or lyric songs are often used for soothing, adapted by means of affectionate addresses to the child, specific interjections, and a monotonous manner of delivery.

== Dance music ==
- Dance music
- Lad's dances in Romania (UNESCO)
- A bătrânilor, (Bihor)
- Brâul pe şapte – Niculae Dobrică, Vasile Bursuc, (Muntenia, 1937)
- Bobocica – Marin Chisăr, Bobocica dance (a brâu variant) (Oltenia, 1941)
- Purtata fetelor de la Căpâlna, processional dance (Alba, Transylvania)
- Arcanul, (Bukovina)

Dance music is the largest stratum of Romanian folklore, numbering thousands of melodies (a single village repertoire may include up to 50 dances). It is almost exclusively instrumental and is marked by strict rhythmic organization required for coordinating the movements of the dancers.

The best-known and most widespread type is the hora, a circular dance symbolizing community unity. In the dance, participants hold hands, forming a closed circle. Hora music typically sounds at a moderate tempo and is built on a binary metric framework (most often 2/4 or 6/8); in a ritual context it often takes on a more restrained, ceremonial tone. It has many variants, from the slow "Great hora" (hora mare) or the wedding "Nuneasca" (nuneasca) to the more lively "Stomped hora" (hora bătută). In contrast stands the sârba – a very fast and energetic dance in 2/4, performed in a circle or in a line (with hands on neighbors' shoulders). A characteristic feature of the sârba is a triplet pulse in the accompaniment, creating the effect of continuous motion; melodies are often marked by virtuosic passagework.

Male dances of the Carpathian area are represented by the type brâu (transl. belt), which demands high skill from performers: steps alternate with jumps, slaps on the legs, and squat-kicks. Brâu music is fast (120–160 beats per minute) and features a syncopated rhythmic pattern. In Muntenia and Moldova the dance is usually in 2/4, whereas in Banat variants with asymmetric meter occur. In Transylvania, the paired dance învârtita ("the turning one") predominates, based on rapid pirouettes. Its meter is complex: most often it is a syncopated 2/4, but asymmetric structures (such as 7/8 or 10/16) also occur, creating a characteristic rhythmic tension.

Dances with asymmetric aksak ("limping") rhythm are most widely distributed in the southern and Danubian regions (Oltenia, Muntenia, Dobruja). These include, in particular, rustem (rhythm 2+3 or 5/16), geampara (rhythm 2+2+3 or 7/16), and șchioapa (transl. limping, rhythm 2+2+2+3 or 9/16). However, this rhythmic type is not limited to the south: in Moldova and Bukovina, for example, the dance ostropăț (rhythm 2+2+3) is widespread and performs a ritual function at weddings.

Dance traditions differ markedly by region. In the south (Muntenia and Oltenia), group circle dances are more common, while in Transylvania paired dances and male solo dances (fecioreasca, ponturi) with rhythmic leg slaps predominate. Transylvania is also characterized by dance suites: several dances follow one another in a stable order and gradually accelerate – from a slow paired dance (for example purtata – "procession") to a moderate one and then to a fast finale.

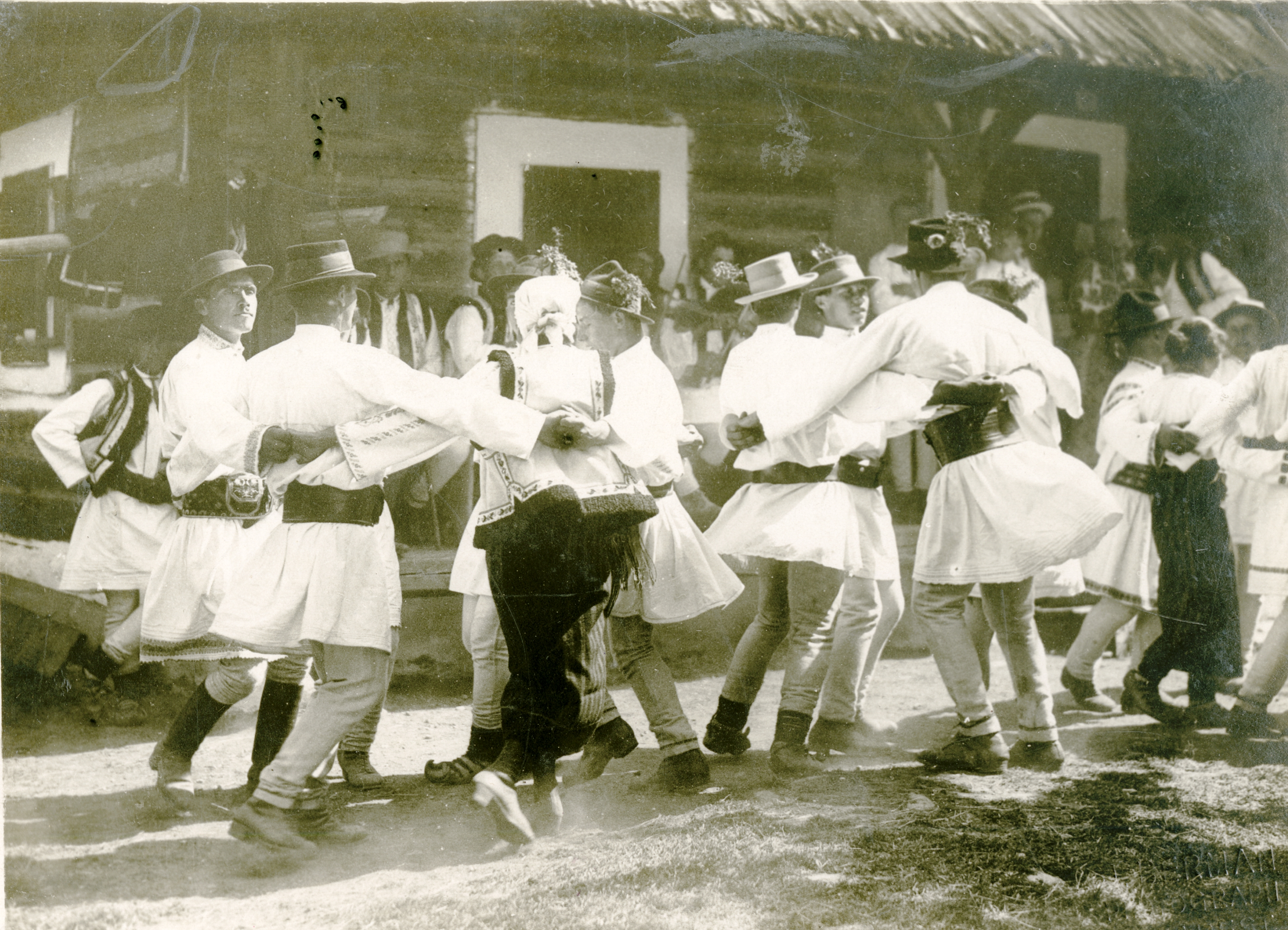
Dance, Bukovina. Photo by Iosif Berman, 1928

The dance repertoire of Moldova (including Bessarabia) and Bukovina combines lyricism and dynamism. Local dances are characterized by small steps and syncopated stomps (predominantly on the weak beat), and in the northern part of the region and in Bukovina – by a characteristic light swaying of the upper body. Large circle dances predominate, such as hora mare or moldoveneasca, which often shift into whirling rotation. Virtuosic male dances have also been preserved in these regions – bătuta, corăgheasca, and especially arcanul – an old dance associated with the shepherd culture of the Carpathians, (Note: It is sometimes also described as a recruit dance. (Alexandru 1975, p. 78)) performed in a circle with rapid changes of figures at the leader's command.

A characteristic feature of Romanian dance is the use of rhymed shouted couplets, strigături, chanted by the dancers. In this way, dancers are given commands to change figures and the public is entertained with satirical comments. In the northern regions (Maramureș, Oaș), these shouts are separated into a distinct vocal figure țâpurituri and, in combination with the instrumental melody, create a complex polyrhythm.

Over the centuries, dance music in rural settings was performed by peasants themselves on the simple instruments (fluier or cimpoi). From the 19th century onward, the leading role gradually passed to professional musicians – lăutari. After the abolition of slavery and the resettlement of Roma, rural lăutari taraf ensembles became an integral part of festivities, displacing amateur soloists and turning Sunday village dances (hora satului) into a sphere of professional music-making. Lăutari did not merely adopt local repertoire but reworked it in accordance with their aesthetic: faster tempi, developed ornamentation, a clear rhythmic pulse, and the presence of chordal accompaniment, which had been absent in archaic peasant monody, are characteristic. Professional musicians in particular contributed to the development of cyclic forms by combining disparate dance tunes into large suites and potpourri.

== Folk musical instruments ==
Musical instruments used in Romanian folk music are commonly divided into two broad groups, associated with different strata of musical life: local pastoral instruments and the mostly borrowed instruments of professional lăutari musicians. The differences between these groups are also evident in performance practice. Playing on traditional instruments is typically characterized by free rhythm, archaic ornamentation, and a monophonic texture ranging from a simple melody to a rudimentary heterophony typical of the oldest layers of folklore. By contrast, lăutărească music is marked by clear rhythmic organization, an chordal foundation, and a more complex ensemble texture, which brings it closer to professional stage music

=== Pastoral and peasant instruments ===
The instruments of shepherds and peasants are autochthonous and among the most ancient in the Romanian tradition. They are used in everyday life – for leisure, signaling, and ritual practice. Wind instruments (aerophones) predominate; they are usually made by the performers themselves or by folk craftsmen from natural materials.

==== Aerophones ====
The most widespread instrument of pastoral life is the fluier, a generic term for shepherd flutes. In folk belief the fluier is regarded as sacred, as reflected in the saying: "God made the fluier and the sheep, while the devil made the cimpoi (bagpipe) and the goat" (Romanian: Dumnezeu a făcut fluierul şi oaia, în timp ce diavolul a făcut cimpoiul şi capra). Seventeen types of fluier are described, differing in size and construction. The most common is the end-blown, fipple fluier (fluier cu dop) with six fingerholes. It occurs in all regions and is especially popular in Oltenia, Muntenia, Dobruja, and southern Moldova. In the same regions, the Romanian caval is also widespread – a long end-blown flute with five fingerholes, characterized by a low, soft, and melancholic timbre.

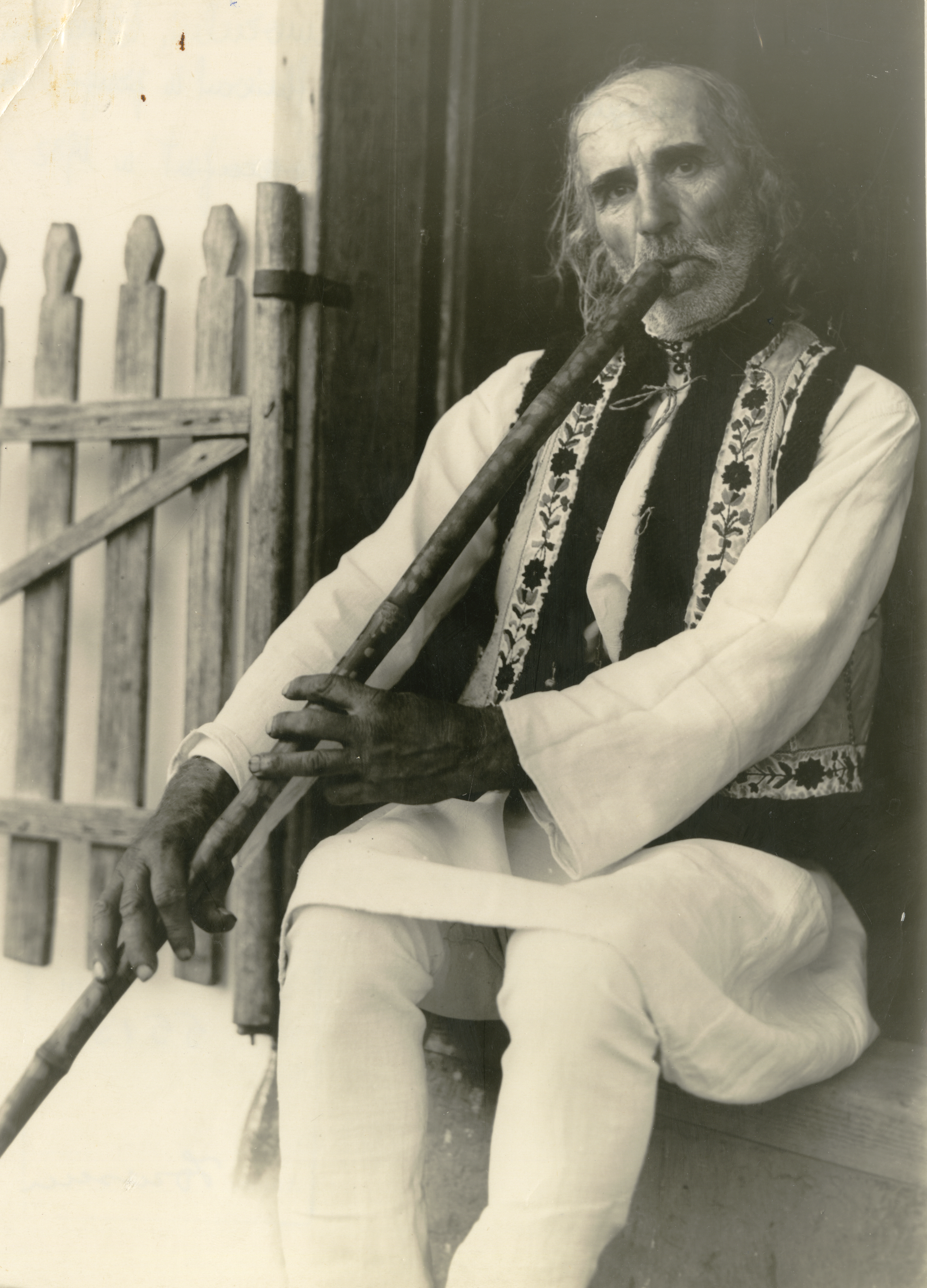
A performer on a large Moldavian fluier at a funeral. Humoreni, Suceava, Bukovina, 1932

In the northern regions (northern Moldova, Bukovina, and partly Maramureș), archaic end-blown flutes without a duct have been preserved: the tilinca (tilincă) and the Moldavian fluier (fluier moldovenesc or fluier fără dop). The tilinca is an overtone flute without fingerholes: the melody is produced by overblowing and by closing the lower end of the tube with a finger. The Moldavian fluier has six fingerholes. A notable subtype is the fluier mare – a large variant characteristic of Bukovina, with a deep, vibrating lower register. Compared to the fipple fluier, the sound of the Moldavian fluier is softer, warmer, and richer in overtones.

The simplest two-part texture is produced by the double fluier (fluier gemănat), consisting of two pipes: one carries the melody, while the other performs a drone. In Dobruja, a Dobrujan fluier with seven fingerholes is also found, as well as the Bulgarian kaval – a large end-blown flute made of three sections with eight fingerholes. In the Carpathian foothills of Oltenia, the fifa has survived – an archaic type of closed fluier without fingerholes that produces a single sustained tone; its sound is alternated with vocal performance in the hăulit style. In eastern Oltenia, folk transverse flutes occur locally.

A major role is played by the bucium – a natural pastoral horn 1.5 to 3 meters long, made from spruce bark, wood, or metal. Sounds are produced from the overtone series; the instrument primarily serves for signaling. In several mountain regions (northern Moldova, Bukovina, Maramureș, Oaș) it is also used in funerary rites. The instrument has various regional names: bucium in the mountains of Muntenia and southern Moldova, tulnic in the Apuseni Mountains, and trâmbița in northern Moldova, Bukovina, and Maramureș.

Cimpoi – the Romanian pastoral bagpipe – long held a prominent place in musical life. It was played for leisure during long pastoral stays and at village festivities. Thanks to the chanter and drone, a single performer produces a dense two-voice sound suitable for dance. By the 20th century it was displaced at festivities by the violin and taraf ensembles; the cimpoi survived mainly in pastoral contexts as an archaic instrument.

==== Idiophones and membranophones ====
In folk practice, idiophones and membranophones are usually tied to specific actions – processions, dance, ritual, or a play episode. In everyday life, especially among women in Transylvania, the drâmbă (drâmbă) was used – the Romanian variant of the Jew's harp. In winter ritual practice an important role is played by the buhai (buhai) – a friction drum with a bundle of horsehair that imitates the bellowing of an ox and is used in the New Year rite "Plugușorul". The large cowbell talanca (talancă) sets the rhythm in the ritual.

In Transylvania and Banat, călușari attach jingle bells (zurgălăi) to their legs, and in Muntenia additionally use metal spurs (pinteni) to emphasize the rhythm of steps and jumps. In Transylvania, bells (clopote) decorate the wedding flag.

In the western regions – Hunedoara, Bihor, Arad and adjacent Banat – colinde are often performed with rhythmic strikes on the duba (dubǎ), a small double-headed drum with a wooden frame (12 cm wide, 20–25 cm in diameter) with two membranes of goat, sheep, or dog skin. The membranes are tightened by a hemp rope, which forms a ring handle. The instrument is held in the left hand and struck with a wooden stick in the right; sometimes it is hung from the neck with a strap. Similar are the doba (dоbǎ) used in northern Moldova to accompany the New Year "Bear Dance". They are much larger (up to 80 cm in diameter), have only one membrane, and are sometimes fitted with metal plates inside the frame; they are played with a stick, the back of a spoon, or the palm.

==== Pseudo-instruments ====
Romanian music also includes "pseudo-instruments" – objects that are not musical instruments in the strict sense but are used for sound production. These include a tree leaf (frunză; most often pear, lilac, acacia, or mulberry), a blade of grass (fir de iarbă), fish scales (solz de pește; usually carp), and birch bark (coajă de mesteacăn). They function as a free reed: the breath causes the material to vibrate in the performer's mouth. Despite their simplicity, such pseudo-instruments have a distinctive timbre and high expressiveness; they are used to play doine, pastoral songs, and even dance tunes. The Romanian organologist Tiberiu Alexandru noted that these simple means can convey the emotional content of folk music no worse than factory-made instruments.

=== Professional instruments of the lăutari ===
In lăutari practice, instruments from urban milieus or borrowed from other cultures and then adapted for folk music predominate. They form the basis of professional ensembles – tarafs.

==== Chordophones ====
The principal melodic instrument of the lăutari is the folk violin (vioară), which displaced earlier string instruments. Lăutari violinists often use scordatura tunings to facilitate playing in certain keys or to imitate the sound of other instruments, such as the cimpoi. In folk tradition the violin is known by various regional names: in southern Transylvania – lăută, in Banat and Hunedoara – laută, and in Maramureș and Oaș – ceteră. In some regions, violin variants with one or more sympathetic (resonance) strings occur. In Bihor there is also a violin with a horn (vioară cu goarnă or laută cu tolcer; a folk variant of the Stroh violin). Here, instead of the usual body there is a membrane and a metal bell: they produce a sharp, directed sound.

The harmonic and rhythmic foundation of the ensemble is provided by accompanying string instruments. In Muntenia and Moldova this role was traditionally played by the cobza – a plucked instrument with a short fretless neck bent almost at a right angle. Over time, the cobza was largely displaced by the cimbalom (țambal), which entered urban music in the 18th century. A distinction is made between small portable cimbaloms (played standing, with the instrument hung from the neck), typical of older tarafs, and large concert cimbaloms widespread since the late 19th century. In northern Oltenia, an accompanying role is played by the folk guitar with three or four strings, tuned on the principle of the cobza (chitară cobzită).

In Transylvanian ensembles, the rhythmic foundation is formed by the braci (also called contră, coantră, săcundă, contralaucă) – a modified violin (sometimes a viola) found in the areas of Năsăud, Mureș and Cluj. The instrument has a flat bridge and three strings. The player stops all strings simultaneously and bows them, producing triadic chords. The bass line is provided by the gordon (gordon, also gordună, cel, broancă) – a folk bass instrument the size of a cello – and by the double bass, sometimes also called gordon. The gordon is played by plucking the strings with the left hand while striking them with a stick in the right. In several regions (Banat, Crișana, Maramureș, Oaș), rhythmic and harmonic accompaniment is also provided by the zongora (zongoră) – a guitar with two or three strings. It is played percussively: the strings are struck with short sharp motions, creating a dense chordal background. In an ensemble with a melodic instrument (the cetera), the zongora functions as a percussive bass and maintains the dance pulse.

==== Aerophones ====
Among wind instruments, a special place is occupied by the nai (Pan flute). Known since antiquity, in Muntenian lăutari practice it became an instrument of virtuoso solo performance. The traditional Romanian nai consists of pipes of reed, bamboo, or elder arranged in a row in a slightly concave shape. The pipes are open at the top and sealed at the bottom with plugs and wax; the amount of wax in the pipes serves for tuning. Each pipe gives one pitch of a diatonic scale. In the 20th century, thanks to masters such as Fănică Luca, the nai became widely known beyond Romania as one of the symbols of Romanian folk music.

Another important aerophone is the taragot – a wooden instrument with a single reed and a conical bore. Originally a Hungarian instrument modified in the late 19th century, it was adopted by Romanian musicians in Banat. The taragot has a powerful, expressive sound; it spread widely and became one of the characteristic instruments of Transylvania and Banat. In modern practice, especially in Banat, its function is often taken over by the saxophone, while in Moldavian ensembles it is often the clarinet; both entered folk usage under the influence of military and civilian wind bands.

In the 20th century, a key instrument of the lăutari ensemble became the accordion (acordeon). Appearing in tarafs in the 1930s, it began to displace the cimbalom and cobza because it can sustain both harmony and rhythm on its own. In the second half of the 20th century, especially in Moldova and Muntenia, the accordion often becomes a leading instrument of the ensemble alongside the violin, also taking on melodic functions.

In Moldova and Bukovina, brass wind instruments (alame) play a significant role: trumpets, trombones, euphoniums (baritones), and helicons. Lăutari, many of whom served in military bands, adapted these instruments to folk music, forming rural brass ensembles – fanfare lăutărești. These groups became widespread at weddings and festivities, performing the dance repertory at fast tempos with a characteristic powerful delivery.

==== Membranophones ====
In a number of villages of Muntenia and Oltenia in the valley of the Olt River, weddings and other festivities still featured, up to the 20th century, an old frame tambourine – the dairea (also dara; local name in Vâlcea – vuvă; cf. Daf). The dairea was also used by the bear-leading Gypsy ursari to beat the rhythm during the bear dance. In lăutari practice, Eastern percussion instruments also occurred – the double-headed davul (daul) and the goblet drum darbuka (darabukkî); from the 19th century they were increasingly replaced by the European bass drum (toba mare). In Moldova in the 20th century, under the influence of military bands and jazz, a drum kit developed known as "jazz" (jaz): a bass drum with cymbals (talgerele) mounted on top, sometimes with the addition of a snare drum.

== Professional tradition: lăutărească music ==
- Lăutărească music
- Traditional music band from Romania (UNESCO)
- Sabarelul – Gheorghe Moțoi, Taraful din Clejani, song (Muntenia, 1952)
- Hora lǎutareascǎ– Ion Albeșteanu, Marin Cotoanțǎ, hora (Muntenia)
- Ca din cimpoi, Ca din caval – Daniel Lăcătuș, (Muntenia)
- Hora cu corzi încălecate – Constantin Lupu, dance music (Moldova)
- Șaraiman – Romica Puceanu, listening song (Bucharest)
- Afară e întuneric – Dona Dumitru Siminică, listening song (Bucharest)
- La cârciuma de la drum – Gabi Luncă, listening song (Bucharest)
- Fanfare Ciocârlia, dance music (Moldova)
- Rustem și suite – Taraf de Haïdouks, dance music (Muntenia)

Lăutărească music developed as the music of professional musicians, in contrast to amateur pastoral music-making. The name derives from the instrument lăută (lute, cobza, and later also the violin), but over time the term broadened and came to denote professional musicians (lăutari) regardless of the instrument they played. The social origins of the lăutari tradition go back to the feudal era: in the Principality of Moldavia and Wallachia musicians held in slavery (Roma) were kept at boyar courts and monasteries to perform at feasts and elite celebrations. Dimitrie Cantemir, describing Moldavian wedding customs in the early 18th century, noted that "they invite musicians, who are scarcely ever not Gypsies". From the 18th century onward, professional lăutari guilds began to form in towns (the earliest recorded in Craiova in 1723); their emergence consolidated the status of lăutari as a distinct social group. After the abolition of slavery in the mid-19th century, lăutari crystallized into closed professional clans and dynasties, transmitting mastery orally within the family.

Lăutari assemble into instrumental ensembles known as tarafs. The membership and sound of a taraf vary by region and reflect local musical dialects and audience preferences. The classical taraf of the southern regions (Muntenia, Oltenia, southern Moldova), which took shape by the 19th century, is built around a string group: the leading folk violin carries the melody, while rhythm and harmony are maintained by the cobza (later largely displaced by the cimbalom) and the double bass; the nai often joins the ensemble. In Transylvania the taraf most often takes the form of a trio in which the violin is accompanied by the braci (also called the contră; a modified violin or viola playing chords) and a double bass, producing a characteristic hard rhythmic pulse.

In Moldova and Bukovina the ensemble is frequently expanded by a wind group (trumpets, clarinet, trombone), giving rise to lăutari brass bands (fanfare). They have replaced Ottoman-type court ensembles (mehterhanea, tabulhana). Fanfare music took shape under the influence of 19th-century Westernization and European military music. Characteristic features include Balkan rhythmic flexibility and an energetic performance style: these rural bands play folk dances at fast tempos, with a powerful and highly expressive delivery.

Lăutari acted as mediators between village and town, as well as between East and West, and this is reflected in their repertoire and style. Alongside shepherd music, an important source for the lăutari repertoire was Byzantine church music, which was preserved and transmitted in the Romanian lands by church singers. According to Nicolae Filimon, lăutari drew on it as one of their sources of musical material. This church singing was based on a modal system, which brought it closer to other musical traditions of the Eastern Mediterranean. In the Phanariot period (18th to early 19th century) they actively adopted elements of Ottoman music, shaping an urban genre associated with the mahala (suburbs; cf. mahalla), and in the 19th century they absorbed Western European harmony, adapting it to the modal nature of Romanian traditional music.

In the 20th century, lăutari instrumentation changed under the impact of urbanization and technological progress. The accordion, which entered tarafs in the 1930s, became widespread and in many cases replaced the cimbalom and cobza: it could carry the melody while simultaneously sustaining harmony.

In the mid-20th century, with the development of sound recording and radio, lăutărească music experienced a boom. Performers of that period – instrumentalists Fănică Luca, Toni Iordache, Nicolae Neacșu, Fărâmiță Lambru, Ion Petre Stoican, as well as vocalists Gabi Luncă, Romica Puceanu and Dona Dumitru Siminică, became well-known and influential musicians. Their work brought mahala music onto the national stage and made the lăutari tradition more visible, including vocal performance characterized by developed melisma and high emotional expressiveness.

Lăutari, Runcu (Gorj)
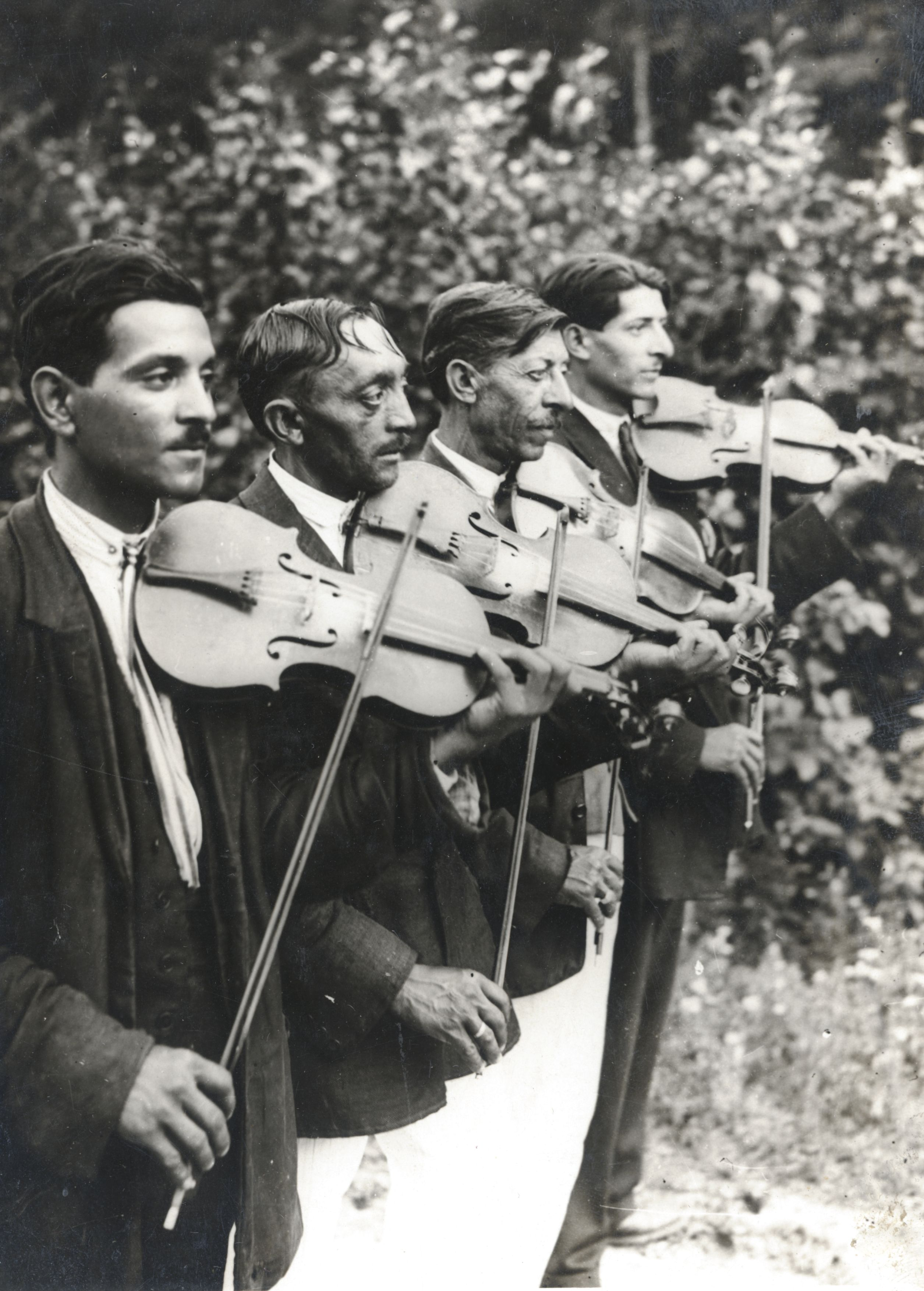
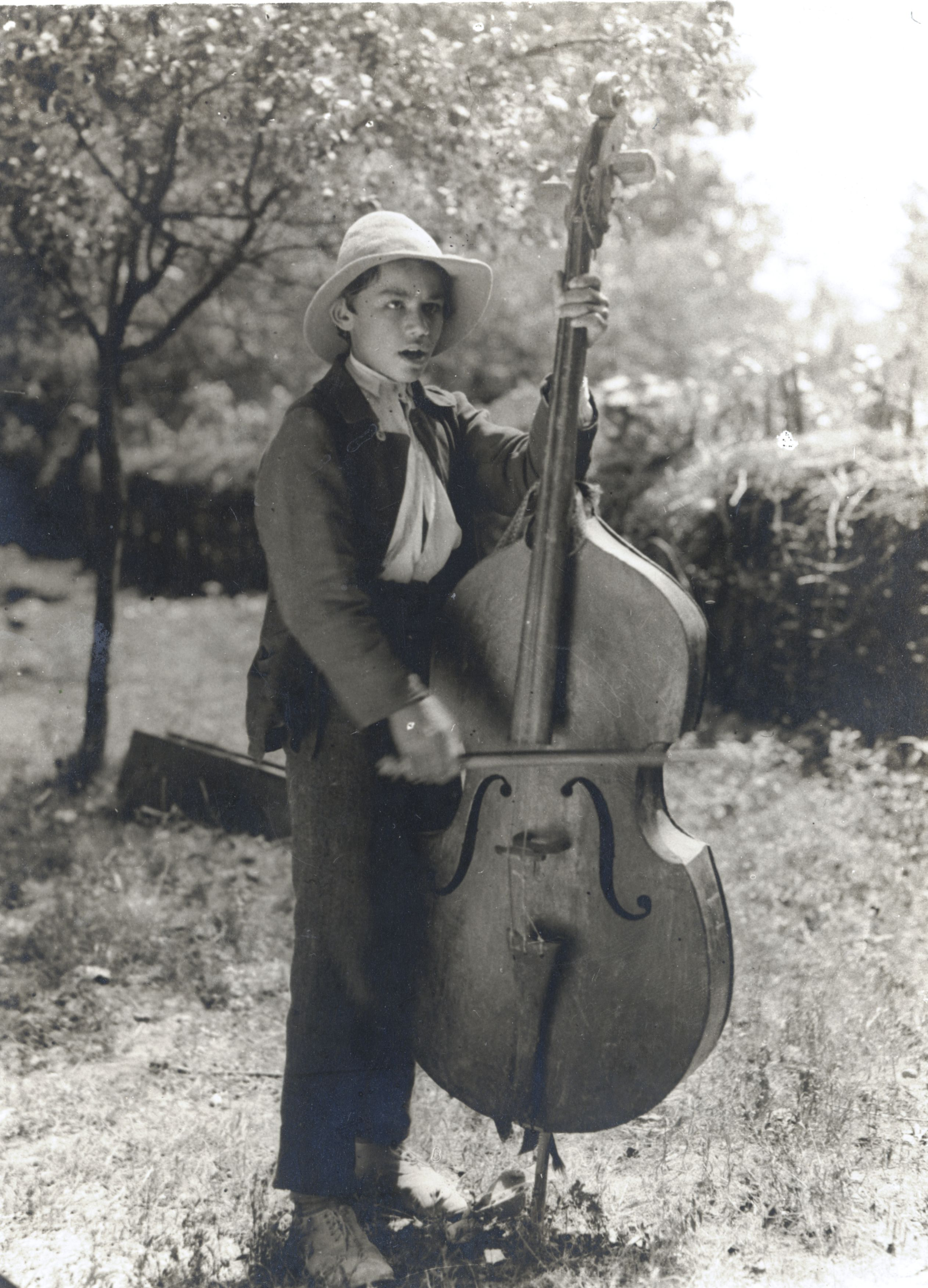
Photo by Iosif Berman, 1930

Lăutari performance is marked by virtuosity and improvisation; scholars often compare it to jazz practice. Musicians constantly embellish the melody with melismas, vibrato and glissando. Violinists use specific instrument tunings to facilitate playing in difficult keys or to imitate the sound of the cimpoi. Lăutari art is characterized by aesthetic eclecticism: depending on the situation and audience expectations, it may combine old songs with urban romances and contemporary dance forms.

The repertory of lăutari is diverse: it includes "listening music" (de ascultare) performed during banquets, dance music, and ritual wedding repertory. In southern Romania, lăutari remain the principal bearers of the epic tradition, performing extended ballads that employ complex recitative. A virtuoso instrumental "love doina" (doina de dragoste) also developed in the professional milieu, characterized by chromatic intervals, Oriental modal systems (maqams), and an developed harmonic language.

In Moldova and Bessarabia, the history of lăutărească music is closely connected with the tradition of Jewish folk musicians – klezmers. Long coexistence of these professional groups led to mutual influence: lăutari incorporated melodies of klezmer origin into their repertory, while klezmers adopted the Romanian doina and hora. It is believed that it was through this interaction that the cimbalom entered the Moldavian taraf, becoming one of its symbols.

From the 18th–19th centuries, urban song genres gradually entered the lăutari repertoire. Researchers link the history of the urban romance to an earlier layer of urban lyrical singing known as cântecul de lume (secular song); the name itself appears from the 17th century. In the urban milieu of the 18th century, such songs were typically structured around romantic themes, featuring Oriental melodic turns and ornamentation in the music; they were composed and performed, including by lăutari, with part of this repertoire later transitioning into their practice of "music for listening". In the process of folklorization, lyrics and melodies often "drifted apart": the same text would be sung to different melodies, while romance melodies were adapted to popular folk lyrics.

== History of research ==
The study of Romanian folk music evolved from the Romantic collecting of the 19th century to the formation of a scholarly ethnomusicology in the 20th century. The earliest notated records of melodies related to the Romanian tradition appear in 16th–17th-century organ tablatures (for example, the Codex Caioni). The first systematic picture of musical life was provided by Dimitrie Cantemir in his Description of Moldavia (1716): he examined ritual music – wedding and funerary – along with the rites of Paparuda, Drăgaica, and Căluș in detail. In 1781, the Austrian historian Franz Josef Sulzer published the first musical transcriptions (10 Romanian dances and songs). The Romanian composer and folklorist Anton Pann, using neumatic notation, issued collections of urban songs titled "Selected verses or secular chants" (1831, 1837). In 1834, Franz Ruzitsky published in Iași a collection titled "Oriental Music: 42 Moldavian, Wallachian, Greek and Turkish songs and dances". The volume contained mainly Romanian folk melodies transcribed for piano.

In the mid-19th century, amid the national revival, the poets Vasile Alecsandri and Alecu Russo began publishing texts of ballads and doine, emphasizing their artistic value. At the same time, the composers Karol Mikuli and Alexandru Berdescu (Alexandru Berdescu) published piano arrangements of folk melodies; in these adaptations they aligned modal structures to Western harmonic norms. In the late 19th century, the folklorist Teodor Burada collected and published folklore materials from various regions inhabited by Romanians. In 1900, the German linguist Gustav Weigand made the first phonograph recordings of Romanian music.

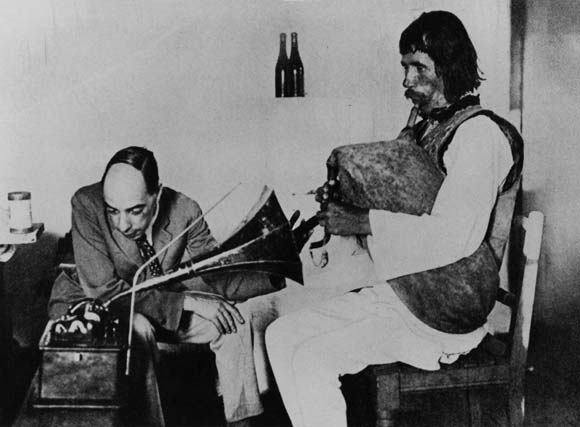
Constantin Brăiloiu recording a cimpoi player (photo by Iosif Berman, 1934)

The scholarly stage began in the first decades of the 20th century – with the spread of the phonograph and the work of Béla Bartók and Constantin Brăiloiu. Between 1908 and 1918, Bartók collected around 3,500 Romanian melodies in Bihor, Maramureș, and other regions; he developed a classification of musical dialects and was the first to describe the parlando rubato rhythm. Brăiloiu founded the Folklore Archive of the Society of Romanian Composers (1928); the archive later became part of the Institute of Ethnography and Folklore "Constantin Brăiloiu" in Bucharest. He developed a rigorous sociological methodology for field research (the concept of "folklore as a social fact"), introduced the terms "proper doina" and "proper song", and provided theoretical foundations for the giusto syllabic and aksak rhythmic systems.

The traditions of the Bucharest school were continued by Brăiloiu's students and contemporaries: George Breazul, Ilarion Cocișiu (Ilarion Cocișiu), Paula Carp, Tiberiu Alexandru and Emilia Comișel, who helped build the Institute of Ethnography and Folklore. The next generation of researchers – Mariana Kahane, Ghizela Suliţeanu (Ghizela Suliţeanu), Anca Giurchescu, Corneliu Dan Georgescu and Speranța Rădulescu – developed folkloristics within modern ethnomusicology. A major role was also played by foreign scholars: A. L. Lloyd (United Kingdom), Ann Briegleb-Schuursma, Margaret Beissinger, Robert Garfias (United States), as well as Jacques Bouët and Bernard Lortat-Jacob (France).

In Bessarabia (later the Moldavian SSR), a significant contribution was made by Petru Ștefănucă, a researcher of the folklore of southern Bessarabia and the Codru zone, and by Vasile Popovici. In the postwar period, a circle of researchers formed in Chișinău: Gleb Ciaicovschi-Mereşanu and Petru Stoianov. Contemporary scholars – Vasile Chiseliță, Victor Ghilaș and Svetlana Badrajan – study folk music and the history of lăutari culture.

The largest collection of recordings of Romanian folk music, numbering more than one hundred thousand items, is held in Bucharest at the Institute of Ethnography and Folklore "Constantin Brăiloiu". The Bartók and Brăiloiu collections are partly available online on the websites of ethnographic museums in Budapest and Geneva.

Among major synthetic works are Tiberiu Alexandru's monographs "Musical Instruments of the Romanian People" (1956) and "Romanian Folk Music" (1975, 1980), the article "Romania. Traditional music" in The New Grove Dictionary of Music and Musicians (2001), and the collective monograph by Moldovan scholars "The Musical Art of the Republic of Moldova" (2009).

== Contemporary situation and trends ==
- Staged folklore
- Hora de la Naipu – Ion Păturică și Orchestra Grigoraș Dinicu (Romania, 1950s)
- Mărunțica – Marin Chisăr (Romania, 1978)
- Țărănească – Anatol Ștefăneț (Moldova)
- Leliță Săftiță – Anton Pann Ensemble (Romania)
- Doină și Bătrâneasca de la Gura Putnei – Trei parale (Romania)
- Cât am fost la mama me – Maria Iliuț și Crenguță de Iederă (Moldova)
- Ziceri Româneşti – Călin Han (Romania)

In the 20th–21st centuries, Romanian folk music has changed against a background of coexistence between archaic forms and globalization. In the communist period in Romania and Soviet Moldova, the state created large professional ensembles (such as "Barbu Lăutaru" in Romania or Lăutarii and Joc in Moldova), which led to an "official" folklore style – technically polished but in many respects standardized. Orchestral unification displaced improvisation and individual manner. At the same time, authentic peasant folklore, closely tied to rural life, has gradually receded. Ritual genres – harvest songs, rainmaking rites, specific forms of lament – disappear together with their bearers or cease to function as magical practice, becoming part of staged folklore.

Lăutărească music adapted more easily to the market environment because it is professional music-making: lăutari play on commission, work in ensembles, and quickly adjust repertory to audience tastes. From the urban lăutari milieu emerged the genre manele, which in the 1990s transformed into dance pop-folk, retaining Oriental melismatic traits. Traditional tarafs such as Taraf de Haïdouks and Fanfare Ciocârlia gained international recognition on the world music scene, presenting Romanian music as a living, virtuoso art.

UNESCO has inscribed a number of practices and genres of Romanian musical folklore on the Representative List of the Intangible Cultural Heritage of Humanity: the Căluș ritual (Romania, 2008), the doina (Romania, 2009), the New Year male group caroling ritual (Romania and the Republic of Moldova, 2013), lad's dances in Romania (2015), and the art of playing the cobza (Romania and the Republic of Moldova, 2025). Traditional music band from Romania (tarafs) were also nominated for inscription in 2020.

== See also ==
- Muzică populară

== Notes ==
Commentaries

== Sources ==
- Cantemir, Dimitrie (2023) [1716]. Brackob, A.K. (ed.). A Description of Moldavia [Descriptio Moldaviae]. Las Vegas: Center for Romanian Studies; Histria Books. ISBN 978-1-59211-025-4.
- Brăiloiu, Constantin (1931). "Esquisse d'une méthode de folklore musical" [Outline of a method for musical folklore]. Revue de musicologie (in French) (40): 233–267.
- Blaga, Lucian (1936). Spaţiul mioritic [The Mioritic Space] (in Romanian). București: Cartea Românească.
- Brăiloiu, Constantin (1949). Metz, M. S. (ed.). Le Folklore musical [Musical folklore] (in French). Zurich: Musica aeterna. pp. 277–332.
- Alexandru, Tiberiu (1956). Instrumentele muzicale ale poporului romîn [Musical instruments of the Romanian people] (in Romanian). Bucureşti: Editura de stat pentru literatură şi artă. p. 388.
- Amzulescu, Alexandru (1964). Balade populare romînești [Romanian folk ballads] (in Romanian). Vol. I. București: Editura pentru literatură.
- Alexandru, Tiberiu (1968). "Constantin Brăiloiu (1893–1958)". Revista de etnografie și folclor (in Romanian). 13 (6). București: Editura Academiei Republicii Socialiste România: 477–480.
- Brăiloiu, Constantin (1974). Comişel, Emilia (ed.). "La musique populaire roumaine (1940)" [Romanian folk music]. Opere (in French). 3. Bucureşti: Editura Muzicală a Uniunii Compozitorilor din Republica Socialista România: 128–137.
- Alexandru, Tiberiu (1975). Muzica populară românească [Romanian folk music] (in Romanian). București: Editura Muzicală.
- Alexandru, Tiberiu (1980). Romanian Folk Music. Bucharest: Musical Publishing House.
- Garfias, Robert (1981a). "Survivals of Turkish Characteristics in Romanian Musica Lautareasca". Yearbook for Traditional Music. 13. International Council for Traditional Music: 97–107.
- Garfias, Robert (1981b). "The Romanian Doina".
- Rădulescu, Speranţa (1990). Cântecul. Tipologie muzicală I. Transilvania meridională [Song. Musical typology I. Southern Transylvania] (in Romanian). Bucureşti: Editura muzicală.
- Sadie, Stanley; Tyrrell, John, eds. (2001). "Romania, III. Traditional music". The New Grove Dictionary of Music and Musicians. Vol. 21 (2nd ed.). New York: Oxford University Press. ISBN 978-0-19-517067-2.
- Chiseliță, Vasile (2002). Muzica instrumentală din nordul Bucovinei. Repertoriul de fluier [Instrumental music of northern Bukovina. Fluier repertoire] (in Romanian). Chișinău: Știința. ISBN 9975-67-256-6.
- Kahane, Mariana (2007). Lupaşcu, Marian (ed.). Doina vocală din Oltenia. Tipologie muzicală [Vocal doina from Oltenia. Musical typology] (in Romanian). Bucureşti: Editura Academiei Române. ISBN 978-973-27-1544-4.
- Filimon, Nicolae (2008). Paşca, Eugenia Maria; Ionescu, Vasile (eds.). "Lăutarii şi compoziţiunile lor (1864)" [Lăutari and their compositions]. Rromii în muzica românească. Antologie de texte şi sinteze (in Romanian). Iaşi: Artes: 125–128. ISBN 978-973-8263-22-2.
- Arta muzicală a Moldovei. Istorie și modernitate [The musical art of Moldova. History and modernity] (in Romanian). Chișinău: Grafema Libris. 2009. ISBN 978-9975-52-046-1.
- Ghilaș, Victor (2009). "Din istoria muzicii tradiționale" [From the history of traditional music]. Arta muzicală a Moldovei. Istorie și modernitate (in Romanian). Chișinău: Grafema Libris: 17–65. ISBN 978-9975-52-046-1.
- Chiseliță, Vasile (2009a). "Fenomenul lăutăriei și tradiția instrumentală" [The lăutari phenomenon and the instrumental tradition]. Arta muzicală a Moldovei. Istorie și modernitate (in Romanian). Chișinău: Grafema Libris: 73–99. ISBN 978-9975-52-046-1.
- Chiseliță, Vasile; Badrajan, Svetlana (2009). "Repertoriul de nuntă" [Wedding repertoire]. Arta muzicală a Moldovei. Istorie și modernitate (in Romanian). Chișinău: Grafema Libris: 166–194. ISBN 978-9975-52-046-1.
- Chiseliță, Vasile (2009b). "Repertoriul funebru" [Funerary repertoire]. Arta muzicală a Moldovei. Istorie și modernitate (in Romanian). Chișinău: Grafema Libris: 195–234. ISBN 978-9975-52-046-1.
- Chiseliță, Vasile (2009c). "Repertoriul muzical păstoresc" [Pastoral musical repertoire]. Arta muzicală a Moldovei. Istorie și modernitate (in Romanian). Chișinău: Grafema Libris: 235–272. ISBN 978-9975-52-046-1.
- Chiseliță, Vasile (2009d). "Cântecul epic tradițional" [Traditional epic song]. Arta muzicală a Moldovei. Istorie și modernitate (in Romanian). Chișinău: Grafema Libris: 273–307. ISBN 978-9975-52-046-1.
- Chiseliță, Vasile (2009e). "Cântecul liric non-ritual. Doina și cântecul propriu-zis" [Non-ritual lyric song: doina and song proper]. Arta muzicală a Moldovei. Istorie și modernitate (in Romanian). Chișinău: Grafema Libris: 308–338. ISBN 978-9975-52-046-1.
- Chiseliță, Vasile (2009f). "Muzica tradițională de dans" [Traditional dance music]. Arta muzicală a Moldovei. Istorie și modernitate (in Romanian). Chișinău: Grafema Libris: 235–272. ISBN 978-9975-52-046-1.
- Secară, Constantin (2010). ""Hori" și "hori în grumaz" din Țara Lăpușului. Confluențe, sincretisme și variante vocal-instrumentale (I)" ["Hori" and "hori in grumaz" from Țara Lăpușului: confluences, syncretisms, and vocal-instrumental variants (I)]. Anuarul Institutului de etnografie şi folclor „C. Brăiloiu", serie nouă (in Romanian). 21: 199–209.
- Guta, Armand (2015). "From Ius Valachicum to the Vlach folkloric influences within Central Europe". Balcanica Posnaniensia. Acta et studia. 22 (1): 71–81. doi:10.14746/bp.2015.22.6.
- Feldman, Walter Z. (2016). Klezmer: Music, History and Memory. New York: Oxford University Press. ISBN 978-0-19-024451-4.
- Feldman, Walter Z. (2020). "Klezmer Tunes for the Christian Bride: The Interface of Jewish and Romanian Expressive Cultures in the Wedding Table Repertoire from Northern Bessarabia". Revista de etnografie și folclor (1–2). București: Editura Academiei Române: 5–35.
- Vǎluțǎ-Cioinac, Diana; Badrajan, Svetlana (2020). "Repere din istoria romanţei de circulație folclorică" [Milestones in the history of the folk-circulated romance]. Studiul artelor și culturologie: istorie, teorie, practică (2 (37)). Chișinău: 123–126. ISSN 2345-1831.
- Beissinger, Margaret H. (2024). ""Songs of Pain": Muzica Lăutărească and the Voices of Romica Puceanu and Gabi Luncă". Music & Minorities. 3: 1–26. doi:10.52413/mm.2024.33.

== External sources ==
- Chiseliţă, Vasile (2011). "Când şi-a pierdut ciobanul oile" [When the shepherd lost his sheep]. Patrimoniul cultural imaterial al Republicii Moldova (in Romanian). Ministerul Culturii al Republicii Moldova. Archived from the original on 2024-11-04.
- "Căluş ritual". UNESCO. 2008. Archived from the original on 2025-08-12.
- "Doina". UNESCO. 2009. Archived from the original on 2025-07-29.
- "Men's group Colindat, Christmas-time ritual". UNESCO. 2013. Archived from the original on 2025-08-06.
- "Lad's dances in Romania". UNESCO. 2015. Archived from the original on 2025-07-24.
- "Traditional music band from Romania". UNESCO. 2020. Archived from the original on 2024-09-12.
- "Cobza, traditional knowledge, skills and music". UNESCO. 2025. Archived from the original on 2025-12-12.
- Bartók, Béla. "Collections at the Museum of Ethnography. Romanian units". bartok.neprajz.hu. Museum of Ethnography. Archived from the original on 2025-04-27.
- Brăiloiu, Constantin. "Collection universelle de musique populaire". Musée d'ethnographie de Genève (in French). Archived from the original on 2024-09-11.
- "Awards for World Music: Taraf de Haïdouks". BBC. 2002. Archived from the original on 2025-02-22.
- "Fanfare Ciocarlia". Asphalt Tango Records. Archived from the original on 2025-09-05.
- "Plai". dexonline.ro (in Romanian). Archived from the original on 2025-06-15.
- "Dor". dexonline.ro (in Romanian). Archived from the original on 2025-12-18.
