= Ion Petre Stoican =

Romani-Romanian violinist

Background information
- Born: 1930; Oltenița, Romania
- Died: 1994 (aged 63–64) Constanța, Romania
- Genre: Lăutărească music
- Instrument: Violin
- Labels: Electrecord, Asphalt Tango Records

Ion Petre Stoican (b. 1930, Oltenița – d. 1994, Constanța) was a Romani-Romanian violinist, a lăutar (performer of traditional lăutărească music, especially for weddings).

== Life ==
He was born in Oltenița, Călărași County, Romania, and was related to celebrated violinist Ion Nămol. Sometime before 1965, during the Communist regime of Gheorghe Gheorghiu-Dej, after observing strange behavior by a man in an audience for whom he was performing somewhere on the Black Sea coast, Stoican helped in arresting an American spy. He was offered a reward of a car or a house, but requested that his reward be to make a record. The result was a 4-song EP on Electrecord, backed by a band put together by the record label for the purpose. However, the record was not a commercial success. After a brief attempt at being a lăutar in Bucharest (where he lacked family connections), he retreated to Constanța, where he was more successful.

In the mid-1970s, Stoican decided to try Bucharest again. In 1977, he managed to make another record on Electrecord, this time an LP with a band of his own choosing. Stoican and trumpeter Costel Vasilescu, taking full advantage of Stoican's prestige as a spy-catcher, if not as a violinist, pulled together an all-star band drawn from the Bucharest music scene of the time. Among others, the album features cimbalom player Toni Iordache, who was responsible for many of the arrangements, and accordionist Ionica Minune. Other than Stoican and Iordache, the 14-piece band were credited only as a "People's Orchestra" rather than by name on the original Electrecord release, but a band photo on the album has allowed the line-up to be definitively identified.

Deanne Sole describes it as "the kind of music he would have used to impress people who might hire him for their festivities", featuring hora dances and other music typical for wedding receptions, more restrained than "the Romani who were recorded more recently, in the post-Ceaușescu era", "indoor" music, "country dances urbanised by streets and walls," but still with "the taut, sweet quality that makes Romanian folk violinists so compelling." Besides horas, the album includes briu, sîrba, and geamparale dance numbers.

The album, recorded when Stoican was already in his late forties, proved to be his belated ticket to prominence among Bucharest lăutari.

German record producer Henry Ernst of Asphalt Tango Records, who first heard Stoican's 1977 LP in 1986 in a small-town record store in Transylvania, began negotiations with Electrecord in 2002 to re-release it. The tapes proved difficult to find, but the album was finally released in 2005 as a CD entitled Ion Petre Stoican: Sounds from a bygone age, Volume. 1.

== Discography ==
- 4 track EP, originally released on Electrecord, c. 1966, name unknown
- album, originally released as an LP on Electrecord, c. 1977, ST-EPE 02166 'Ion Petre Stoican muzică lăutărească', re-released 2005 as a CD on Asphalt Tango Records, as Ion Petre Stoican: Sounds from a bygone age, Volume. 1.

=== Credits for Ion Petre Stoican: Sounds from a bygone age, Volume. 1 ===
Musicians
Ion Petre Stoican - violin
Nicu Sapteluni - violin
Marian Grigore - violin
Matei Niculescu - violin
Mihai "Rita" Gheorghe - double bass
Fane Negrila - doublebass
Ionica Minune - accordion
Viorel Fundament - accordion
Guta "Toi" Vasile - violin
Toni Iordache - cymbalom
Mieluta Bibescu - clarinet
Grigore Vasile - clarinet
Costel Vasilescu - trumpet
Nicu Manole - violin

Tracks

1. Hora lui Sile 03:33
2. Hora de la Constanţa 02:39
3. Moşule, te-aş întreba 04:36
4. Hora de la Olteniţa 02:37
5. Ia-ia-ţi mireasă, ziua buna 08:33
6. Hora lui Mihalea 02:32
7. Chiar dacă dau de necaz 02:45
8. Melodia lui Sile 02:15
9. Hora lăutareasca 03:11
10. Briu din Olteniţa 01:45
11. Hora de joc de la Olteniţa 01:39
12. Hora 02:40
13. Sîrba de joc din Constanţa 02:35
14. Hora de la Luceni 01:29
15. Sîrba 02:08
