= Petre Ștefănucă =

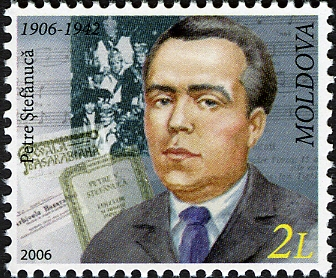
- Born: 14 November 1906; Ialoveni, Bessarabia Governorate, Russian Empire
- Died: 12 July 1942 (aged 35); Tatar Autonomous Soviet Socialist Republic
- Education: University of Bucharest
- Spouse: Nina Cușnir (1909 – 1942)
- Children: Alecu and Victor

Petre Ștefănucă (14 November 1906 – 12 July 1942) was a Bessarabian sociologist.

== Biography ==
He was born in Ialoveni on 14 November 1906. He attended the Alexandru Donici High School in Chișinău and in 1932 he graduated from the Faculty of Philosophy and Letters of the University of Bucharest.

After the Soviet occupation of Bessarabia in June 1940, he was arrested by the NKVD and sent to the Gulag. He died there on 12 July 1942 in the Tatar Autonomous Soviet Socialist Republic.

== Works ==
- "Folclor din judetul Lapușna",
- "Literatura populară a satului Iurceni",
- "Cercetări folclorice pe valea Nistrului-de-Jos",
- "Două variante basarabene la basmul Harap-Alb al lui Ion Creangă",
- "Datinele de Crăciun și Anul nou pe valea Nistrului-de-Jos",
- "Amintiri din războiul mondial (Adunate de la soldații moldoveni din comuna Cornova, județul Orhei)" și altele.

== Bibliography ==
- Petre Ștefănucă, "Folclor și tradiții populare". Alcătuire, studiu introductiv, bibliografie, comentarii și note de Grigore Botezatu și Andrei Hîncu.
