= Toni Iordache =

Romanian musician

- Born: December 17, 1942
- Died: February 20, 1988 (aged 45)
- Genres: Lăutărească music
- Instrument: cimbalom

Toni Iordache (17 December 1942 – 20 February 1988) was a Romani-Romanian lăutar and one of the most famous cimbalom (Romanian: ţambal) players in the world. He was nicknamed the God of the Cimbalom and Paganini of the cimbalom.

== Early life ==
Toni was born in Bâldana village, near Bucharest, and began learning the instrument from his father when he was four. Some years later his family would move to Bucharest in the Herăstrău neighborhood, where many famous lăutari lived. There, Toni continued to learn from Mitică Ciuciu, who was a famous cimbalom player in his days.

== Career ==
At 12, he was employed at the National Radio Orchestra of Popular Music. Later he became a member of the Ciocârlia National Ensemble, the primary popular ensemble in the country. With the Ciocârlia Ensemble, Toni Iordache toured the world: many European countries, the USA and also Asian countries. In between tours, he would play at weddings, being the most sought after lăutar of his day. Often, after landing at the airport he would drive directly to a wedding where the other musicians were waiting for him.

He won two gold medals: in Vienna(1959) and Sofia (1966) and appeared as guest soloist on Zoltan Kodaly's 'Hary János Suite' performed by the NHK Symphony Orchestra, in Tokyo, in 1973.

Among others, he played with Romica Puceanu, Gabi Luncă, Ion Onoriu, Ionică Minune and also with the well-known pan flute (nai) player Gheorghe Zamfir.

== Imprisonment ==
In the early seventies Toni Iordache was arrested for possession of foreign currency, which was strictly forbidden in communist Romania. He reportedly wanted to buy a fur coat for his wife with it. Despite his high popularity and interventions in his favor, he was sentenced to three years in jail. His imprisonment was kept secret from the press; only his friends knew. During his time in jail he lost a lot of weight, but he recovered quickly after his release and was able to resume his musical activity. His time in jail was made easier by both his fellow inmates and guards that were very fond of him.

== Death ==
Toni Iordache became seriously ill with diabetes. The doctors recommended to have his leg amputated, but the operation did not save his life. He died in February 1988. His friend and fellow musician Costel Vasilescu (also known as Costel Trompetistu') took care of the funeral.

== Style ==
Although he played a lot of the "popular" music that was promoted by the communist regime, Toni Iordache remained known among aficionados especially for his work as a lăutar. His solos were very complex, but also clear and beautiful and his improvisations were full of imagination. He was not only a very virtuoso player (he was measured in Paris to be able to play 25 notes per second), but also a very sophisticated one, with a high emphasis on touch, playing the slow pieces with great sensibility. He was able to play two melodic lines simultaneously at high tempos and knew how to use the full capacities of the cimbalom.

== Other information ==
- The great conductor Sergiu Celibidache embraced him with tears in his eyes after attending one of his shows.
- Toni Iordache was the one that nicknamed the great Romanian accordionist Ionică Minune (Johnny The Wonder).
- The great singer Gabi Luncă recounted that they were in a concert during the major 1977 earthquake. Toni Iordache was so concentrated on his solo that he didn't even notice the earthquake.
- He was described as "pure genius" by Chris Nickson in his review from AllMusic.
- His son Leonard is also an accomplished cimbalom player. His grandson Bogdan was also studying the cimbalom but died in a highway car accident in July 2011 aged 23.
