= Iosif Berman =

Romanian photographer and journalist

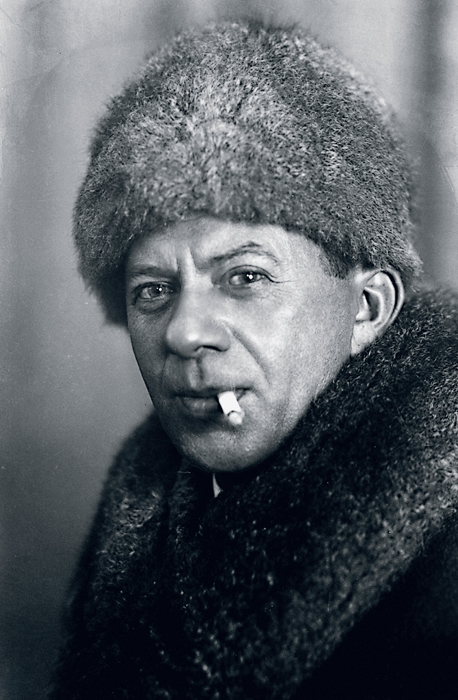
- Iosif Berman's photographic self-portrait, ca. 1938
- Born: January 17, 1890; Burdujeni, Kingdom of Romania
- Died: September 17, 1941 (aged 51); Bucharest, Kingdom of Romania
- Other name: I. B. Urseanu
- Occupations: Photographer, journalist
- Years active: 1913–1940
- Spouse: Raisa

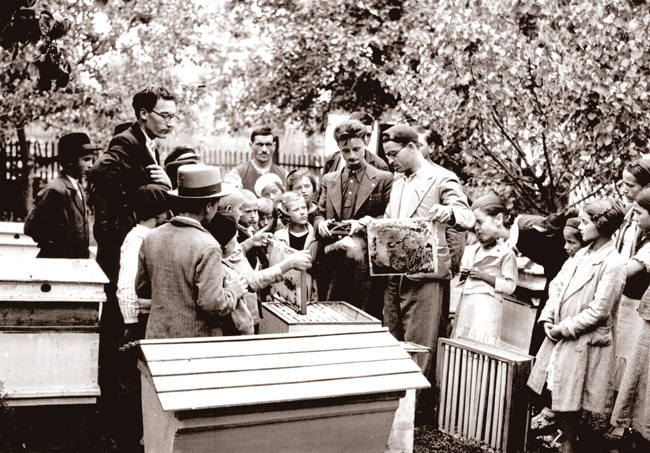
The team of ethnographic research coordinated by Dimitrie Gusti

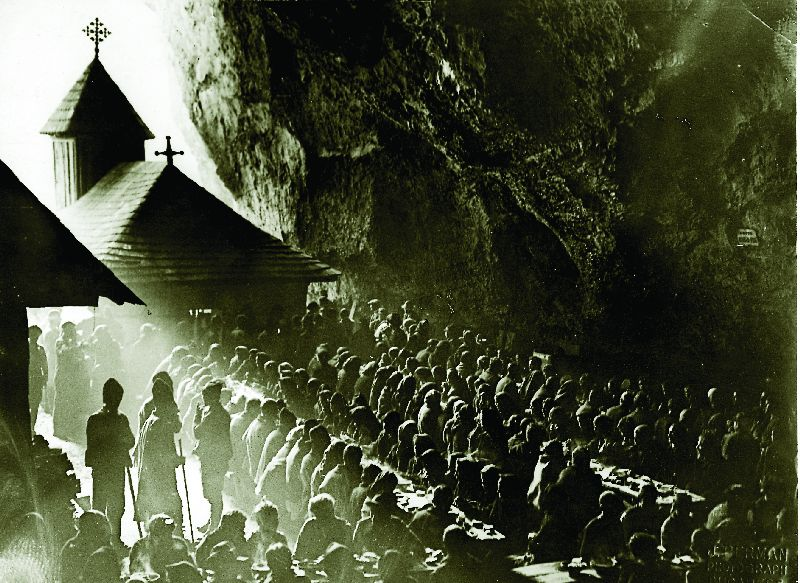
A feast at a monastery, photograph by Iosif Berman

Iosif Berman (January 17, 1890, Burdujeni – September 17, 1941) was a Romanian photographer and journalist during the interwar period.

== Early life ==
Iosif Berman was born in Burdujeni, near Suceava to a Jewish father who had been awarded Romanian citizenship for participating in the 1877 Romanian War of Independence.

From an early age, Berman became interested in photography, and as a child he spent time in the company of the itinerant photographers of Suceava and Cernăuți. Before the age of 18, he moved to Bucharest, where he earned money to buy a camera. His first photos were published in 1913 in the newspaper Dimineaţa depicting the cholera lazaretto from Turtucaia. He continued working at Adevărul and Dimineaţa newspapers, both of which were owned by left-wing activist Constantin Mille.

During World War I, he was a regiment photographer and he was able to take photos of the October Revolution in Odessa, but his photographic plates were confiscated, on turns, by the Whites and by the Bolsheviks. In 1918, he contributed to Realitatea Ilustrată with a set of photographs of the fleeing German Army. After his regiment was disbanded, he traveled to Novorossiysk, in the Caucasus, where he met Raisa, whom he married and with whom he had a daughter, Luiza.

== Photojournalist ==
Between 1920 and 1923, he was a correspondent from Istanbul for the Romanian newspaper. After returning to Romania, he was a photographer for the major Romanian newspaper, taking photographs of the Royal Family.

During the mid-1920s, Berman collaborated with sociologist Dimitrie Gusti, who studied the Romanian village and traditions, and with Filip Brunea-Fox for his reportage articles.

His photographs were published in all the major Romanian newspapers of the time: Adevărul, Dimineaţa, Curentul, Realitatea ilustrată, România ilustrată, Ilustraţiunea română, Cuvântul liber, L'Indépendance roumaine and also in The New York Times and National Geographic, being a correspondent of the Associated Press and Scandinavian Newspaper Press.

== Fascist era ==
In 1937, the Octavian Goga government closed down the left-wing newspapers for which he worked and his life's work, the boxes with the photographic plates from the archive of the Adevărul and Dimineaţa newspapers were confiscated. Nevertheless, he continued to work and to send photographs to The New York Times.

Following the advice of Romanian historian and later Prime Minister Nicolae Iorga, Berman began using a pseudonym, I. B. Urseanu, (which is a translation of his Jewish name) in order not to attract the attention of the antisemitic Iron Guard.

Nevertheless, in 1940, he was banned from continuing his work due to the Anti-Jewish laws which were enacted by the National Legionary State. Depressed, he soon died on September 17, 1941. According to his daughter, he succumbed to a renal disease for which he refused to get any treatment.

== Legacy ==
After World War II, the communist government tried to use the photos for propaganda, but they were hardly propaganda material. According to a researcher at Museum of the Romanian Peasant, he presented a realist view of the village, with its poor, its gypsies, and its village idiot.

Nevertheless, the photos were rediscovered after the Romanian Revolution at the Museum of the Romanian Peasant, which also published a monography on him. A documentary on his life and work was also made, called "Omul cu o mie de ochi" (The Man with a Thousand Eyes), directed by Alexandru Solomon.
