= Recto tono =

Recto tono is a Latin phrase used in the context of Catholic church liturgy and music. Recto tono has been described as "the simplest form of church music, a reciting tone. One note held for the length of a phrase." It literally means "straight" or "uniform" tone. In liturgical chanting, recto tono is used to recite without embellishment or elaborate singing.
