= Ionică Minune =

- Birth name: Gheorghe Ene
- Born: February 13, 1959 (age 66)
- Genres: Lăutărească music; jazz; manouche jazz
- Instrument: accordion

Gheorghe Ene (born February 13, 1959), known as Ionică Minune, is a Romani-Romanian accordionist.

== Life and career ==
Ionică Minune was born in Costeşti, Buzău County, Romania into a family of lăutari. The members of his family played different instruments and they used to be booked together as one taraf (band) at various events in the village. At the age of four, Ionică took his older brother accordion and played a waltz by ear without any kind of training. Since then he continued to play and practice, mostly for his own pleasure, as he didn't want to become a professional musician.

In the early 1990s he moved to France. There, besides lăutărească music, he started to play jazz, manouche jazz, as well as other kinds of music. Despite living a good life (he received French citizenship and an apartment) he did not feel very comfortable in France and returned to Romania in 2006. There, he started an accordion school together with the accordionist Constantin "Fulgerică" and the cimbalom player Cristinel Turturică (a former member of Taraf de Haïdouks).

Throughout his career, besides many great lăutari, Ionică Minune played with artists such as Bobby McFerrin, Oscar Peterson, Michel Petrucciani, Richard Galliano, Marcel Azzola, Didier Lockwood, Tschavolo Schmitt and Florin Niculescu.
