= Sârbă =

Folk dance

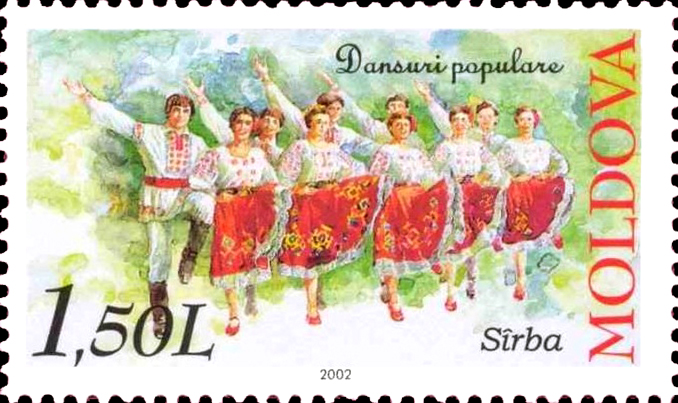
Sîrba, Moldova

A Sârbă (Moldovan spelling: sîrba; Cyrillic Moldovan: сырба) is a Romanian folk dance normally played in 6/8 or 12/8 time.

== History ==
The word Sârbă literally means "Serbian". It can be danced in a circle, line, or couple formations and alternates between travelling or resting phrases.

It was historically popular not only in Romania, but also in Moldova, Serbia, Ukraine, Hungary, Polish highlanders (Gorals) and Ashkenazi Jews. It is fast-paced and triplets are usually emphasized in the melody. The sârba is still popular in Romanian traditional music and in Jewish Klezmer music. In Serbia its version is called Vlaski ("Wallachian").
