= List of bagpipers =

This is a list of bagpipers, organized by type of bagpipes.

== Historically notable bagpipers ==
- King Edward VII, (1841–1910)
- King Edward VIII, (1894–1972)
- Daniel Laidlaw, (1875–1950), VC Piper in the Kings Own Scottish Borderers who received the Victoria Cross during World War I, the highest award for gallantry that can be awarded to British and Commonwealth forces

== Highland Bagpipers ==
- Kostadin Varimezov
- Alasdair Gillies
- Angus MacColl
- Anthony Field
- Bill Millin
- Daniel Laidlaw, VC
- Eric Rigler
- Fred Morrison
- Gordon Duncan
- Jack Churchill
- Jack Lee
- Jamie Holton
- John Burgess
- Jori Chisholm
- Martyn Bennett
- Pipe Major Donald MacLeod, MBE
- Pipe Major William Lawrie
- Richard Parkes
- Stuart Liddell
- Willie McCallum

== Northumbrian smallpipers ==
- Billy Pigg
- Dick Hensold
- Jack Armstrong
- Joe Hutton
- John Peacock
- Kathryn Tickell
- Tom Clough

== Scottish smallpipers ==
- Fred Morrison
- Iain MacInnes
- Brìghde Chaimbeul

== Asturian bagpipers (gaiteros) ==
- Hevia
- La Reina del Truébano

== Galician bagpipers (gaiteiros) ==
- Anxo Lorenzo
- Avelino Cachafeiro
- Carlos Núñez
- Cristina Pato
- Susana Seivane

== Swedish bagpipes ==
- Anders Norudde
- Olle Gällmo
- Per Gudmundson

== Uilleann pipes ==
- Calum Stewart
- Cillian Vallely
- Davy Spillane
- Declan Masterson
- Edmund Keating Hyland
- Eric Rigler
- Fred Morrison
- Jerry O'Sullivan
- Johnny Doran
- Leo Rowsome
- Liam O'Flynn
- Mick O'Brien
- Paddy Keenan
- Paddy Moloney
- Ronan Browne
- Séamus Ennis
- Seán McKiernan
- Sean McAloon
- Tomás Ó Canainn
- Troy Donockley
- Willie Clancy

== Other notable bagpipers ==
- Anxo Lorenzo
- Giles Lewin
- Glen Campbell
- Hevia
- Joan Denise Moriarty
- Jonathan Davis
- John Grant (pipe-major)
- Sam Sweeney
- Sevan Kirder
- Norman Macleod
- Vassil Bebelekov
- William P. Barr

== Notable bands with nontraditional use of bagpipes ==
- AC/DC (Bon Scott era)
- Afro-Celt Sound System
- Albannach
- The Bad Shepherds
- Big Country
- Black 47
- Blowzabella
- Capercaille
- Ceoltoiri Chualann
- The Chieftains
- The Clutha
- Corvus Corax
- Cruachan
- Danú
- dArtagnan
- Dixebra
- Dropkick Murphys
- Eluveitie
- Enter the Haggis
- Feuerschwanz
- Flatfoot 56
- Flogging Molly
- Glengarry Bhoys
- Grave Digger
- Hedningarna
- In Extremo
- Ithilien
- John Farnham
- KoЯn
- Led Zeppelin
- Luar na Lubre
- Lúnasa
- Milladoiro
- Moving Hearts
- Mozaik
- Mudmen
- Nightwish
- Niteworks
- Off Kilter
- Ossian
- Panacea
- Patrick Street
- Paul McCartney and Wings
- Planxty
- Prydein
- Real McKenzies
- Salsa Celtica
- Saltatio Mortis
- Schandmaul
- Seven Nations
- Skelpin
- Skiltron
- Skyedance
- Skyforger
- Stary Olsa
- Subway to Sally
- Tanzwut
- The Battlefield Band
- The Bothy Band
- The Kathryn Tickell Band
- The Pogues
- The Tannahill Weavers
- Trad.Attack!
- Tri Yann
- Triddana
- U2
- The Wiggles
- Wicked Tinkers
- Wolfstone

== See also ==
- Canadian pipers in World War I
- List of pipe bands
