= Traditional music of Galicia, Cantabria and Asturias =

Music

The musical traditions of the Northwest Iberian Peninsula include those of Galicia, Asturias, and Cantabria. The music of Galicia and Asturias is characterized by the use of bagpipes, with some similarities to the music of Cantabria.

== History ==
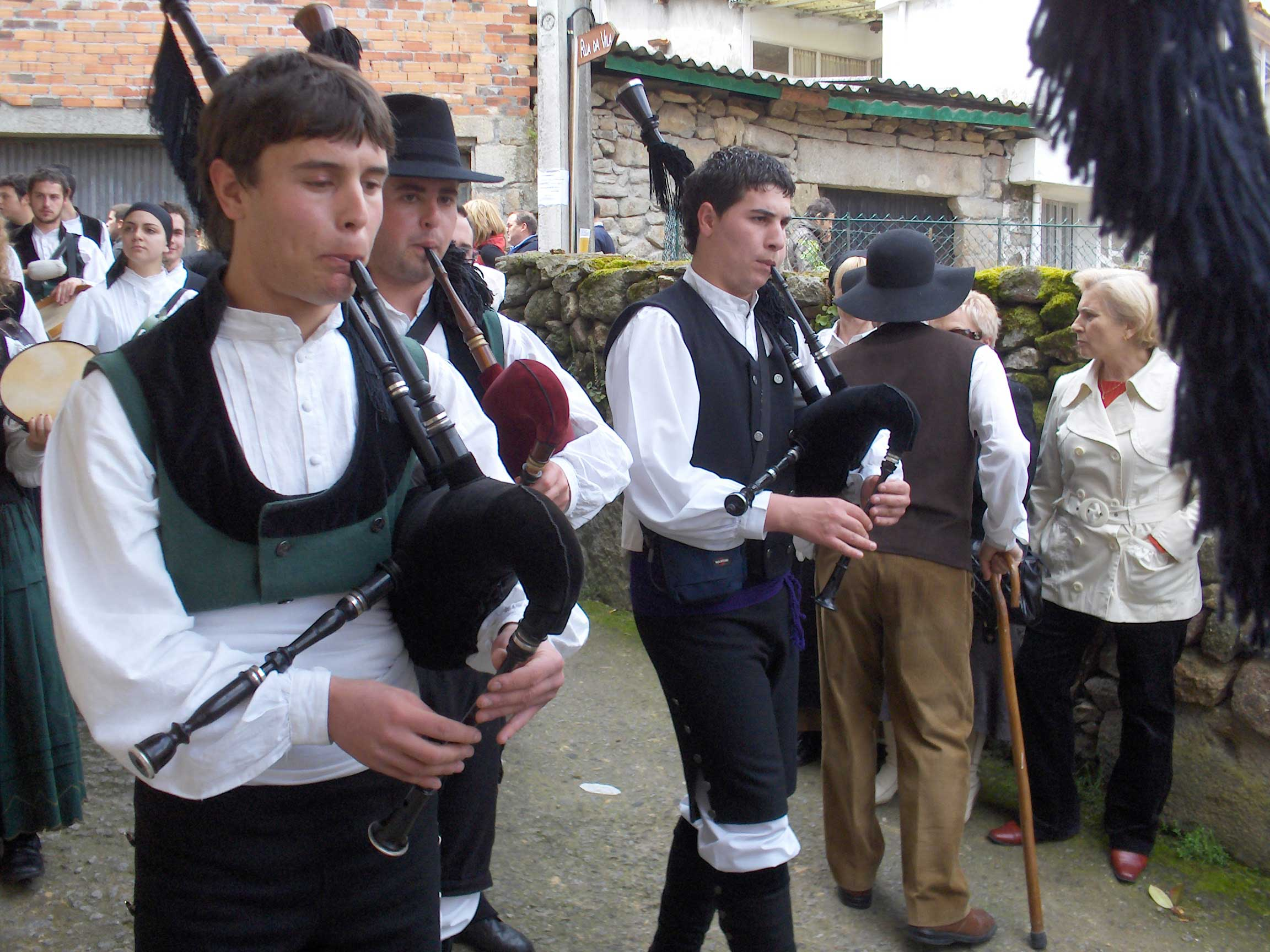
Galician gaiteiros

It has long been thought that Galician and Asturian music might owe their roots to the ancient Celtic history of the region. It was presumed that some of this ancient influence had survived despite the long evolution of the local musical traditions since then, including centuries of Roman and Germanic influences. Whether or not this is the case, much modern commercial Galician and Asturian traditional and folk-rock of recent years has become strongly influenced by modern Irish, Scottish and Welsh "folk" styles. Galicia is nowadays a strong player on the international Celtic folk scene. As a result, elements of the pre-industrial Galician tradition have become integrated into the modern Celtic folk repertoire and style. Many, however, claim that the "Celtic" appellation is merely a marketing tag; the well known Galician bagpipe player Susana Seivane, said "I think [the 'Celtic' moniker is] a label, in order to sell more. What we make is Galician music". In any case, due to the Celtic brand, Galician music is the only non- Castilian-speaking music of Spain that has a significant audience beyond the country's borders. Some Galicians and Asturians have complained that the "Celtic boom" was the final death blow to once highly distinctive musical traditions.

Celtic culture is known to have extended over a large part of the Iberian Peninsula as early as 600BC. During the 2nd and 1st centuries BC, the Roman Empire slowly conquered Iberia, which they called Hispania. The Celtic regions put up a long and fierce struggle to maintain their independence but were eventually subdued. In the centuries that followed, the language of the Romans, Latin, came to gradually supplant nearly all the earlier languages of the peninsula, including all Celtic languages, and is the ancestor of most of the current languages of Spain and Portugal other than Basque, including Galician and Astur-Leonese-Mirandese. The departure of the Romans in the 5th century led to the invasions of Germanic tribes. The Suebi people conquered the northwest but the poor documentation from the period has left their cultural impact on the region unclear. In the 6th century, a final small Celtic influx arrived from Britain; the Britons were granted their own diocese, Britonia, in northern Galicia. Galicia was then taken over by the Visigothic Kingdom when the Suebian kingdom fell apart. Galicia came under the control of the Moors after they defeated the Visigoths in 717 but Moorish rule was little more than a short lived military occupation, although an indirect Moorish musical influence arrived later, through Christian troubadours. Moorish rule ended after two decades when their garrison was driven out by a rebellion in 739. The region was incorporated into the Kingdom of Asturias and, after surviving the assaults of the Moors and Vikings, became the springboard for the Reconquista.

In 810, it was claimed that the remains of Saint James, one of the apostles, had been found at a site which soon became known as Santiago de Compostela. It became Europe's premier pilgrimage destination in the Middle Ages. This is assumed to have had a significant effect on the folk culture of the area, as the pilgrims brought with them musical instruments and styles from as far afield as Scandinavia and Hungary.

Like the earlier periods, little is known about musical traditions from this era. Just a few manuscripts from the time are known, such as those by the 13th-century poet and musician Martín Codax, which indicate that some of the distinctive elements of today's music, such as the bagpipes and flutes, were common at the time. The Cantigas de Santa Maria, a collection of manuscripts written in old Galician, also show illustrations of people playing bagpipes.

=== Revival ===
The Galician folk revival drew on early 20th century performers like Perfecto Feijoo, a bagpipe and hurdy-gurdy player. The first commercial recording of Galician music had come in 1904, by a corale called Aires d'a Terra from Pontevedra. The middle of the century saw the rise of Ricardo Portela, who inspired many of the revivalist performers, and played in influential bands like Milladoiro.

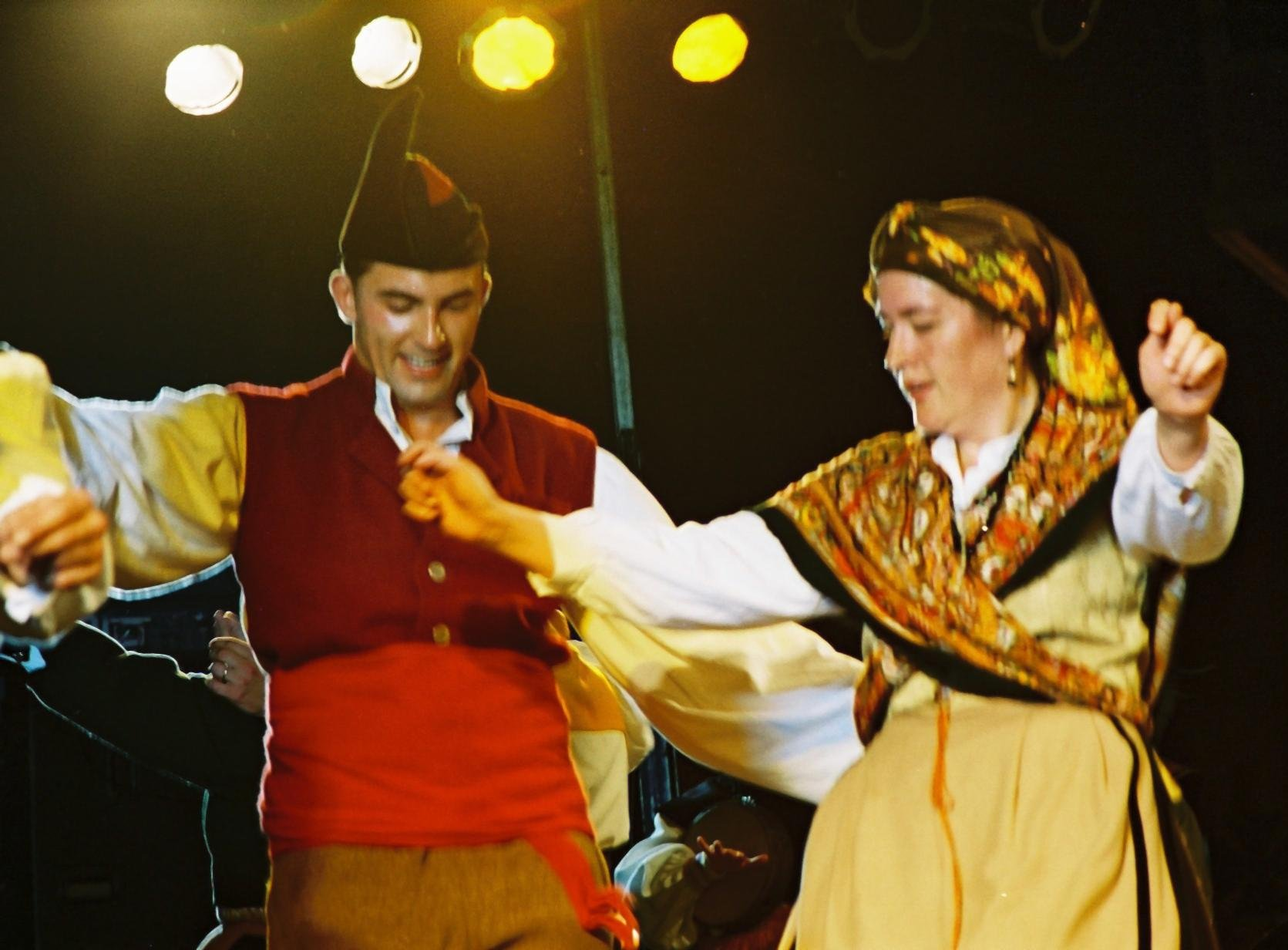
Asturian folk dancers

During the regime of Francisco Franco, honest displays of folk life were appropriated for politicised spectacles of patriotism, causing a sharp decline in the popularity of the traditional styles in favour of modern music. When Franco's regime ended in 1975, Galician and Asturian music experienced a strong revival and recordings flourished. The establishment of the Festival Internacional do Mundo Celta (1977), which helped establish some Galician bands. Aspiring performers began working with bands like Os Areeiras, Os Rosales, Os Campaneiros and Os Irmáns Garceiras, learning the folk styles; others went to the renowned workshop of Antón Corral at the Universidade Popular de Vigo. Some of these musicians then formed their own bands, like Milladoiro.

In the 1980s and 1990s, some Galician and Asturian performers began to win fame within Spain and the international Celtic folk scene. Galician musicians of this period included Uxía, a singer originally with the band Na Lúa, whose 1995 album Estou vivindo no ceo and a subsequent collaboration with Sudanese singer Rasha, gained her an international following. The appearance of Fía na Roca, (that means "Spin in the spinning wheel") was undoubtedly one of the key events of the Galician musical scene in the 90's. Fía na Roca was also the name of their debut album released in 1993. Its mixture of tradition and modernity led BBC to choose the music of this album as the soundtrack of the TV program that broadcast the Galician image to Europe in the 1993 Xacobeo Celebration (Santiago de Compostela's Holy Year).

It was Carlos Núñez, however, who has done the most to popularize Galician traditions. His 1996 A irmandade das estrelas sold more than 100,000 copies and saw major media buzz, partially due to the collaboration with well-known foreign musicians like La Vieja Trova Santiaguera, The Chieftains and Ry Cooder. His follow-up, Os amores libres, included more fusions with flamenco, Celtic music (especially Breton) and Berber music. The album received a Latin Grammy nomination for Best Folk Album.

Other modern Galician bagpipe players include Xosé Manuel Budiño and Susana Seivane. Seivane is especially notable as the first major female player, paving the way for many more women in a previously male-dominated field. Galicia's most popular singers are also mostly female, including Uxía, Sonia Lebedynski and Mercedes Peón.

A revival of traditional Asturian music also occurred during this period. Artists such as the popular bagpiper Hevia and music groups such as Llan de cubel and Tejedor helped to bring attention to Asturian folk music both within Asturias itself, and in the wider realm of the "Celtic" and world music scenes. Musicians from Asturias have become increasingly prominent at events such as the Festival Interceltique de Lorient in France.

=== Present ===
In current times, the most traditional forms of traditional music have their audience, as well as the variations that emerged in the 80s and 90s. In recent years, new trends have also emerged that mix traditional Galician music with electronics. The first hit song that mixes Galician traditional music with electronics dates back to 1978, when the group Son Lalín launched their version of Muiñeira de Chantada, created by the producer Gustavo Ramudo. Nowadays Mercedes Peón and Baiuca stand out.

== Traditional instruments ==
Traditional instruments in Galicia, Asturias and Cantabria include the well-known Gaita, a kind of bagpipe, as well as an array of percussion and wind instruments.

=== Wind instruments ===
Folk wind instruments of the area include the Cantabrian pitu montañés, a kind of conical-bored shawm with seven holes in the front and one in the back, which is played in a similar manner to the bagpipe chanter. While it was traditionally made in E-flat, the instrument has been revitalized by Antón Corral, who makes them in D. A transverse flute with six holes is called a requinta; it is similar to the fife. It is usually in G, or sometimes a high C. Traditional Galician wind instruments include the pito pastoril (galego), literally (Galician) shepherd's whistle. Despite the similarity in name, this instrument belongs to a different family than the Cantabrian pitu montañés, namely that of the fipple flutes, which also includes the tin whistle and the recorder. The instrument has seen a revival in the second half of the 20th century and the beginning of the 21st century, finding a place in traditional music ensembles. Other wind instruments include chifre, ocarina and the imported clarinet and accordion. Cantabria has a rich dance repertoire for soprano clarinet, also known as pitu or requinto (not to be confused with the requinta fife).

=== String instruments ===
Plucked stringed instruments are common throughout Spain and Portugal, but they were proscribed in Galician or Asturian commercial folk music until recent years. Modern guitarists like Xesús Pimentel often use strong flamenco influences in their sound. The violin has a long tradition in the area, common since the early 20th century, when blind fiddlers traveled to fairs to play traditional and self-composed songs, as well as pieces by composers like Sarasate. The hurdy gurdy (zanfona) has been played in the area for many centuries, but had mostly died out by the middle of the 20th century before being revived by Faustino Santalices, Xosé Lois Rivas and the like. Though the instrument is now more closely associated with French music, the first recordings of the hurdy gurdy were by Galician Perfecto Feijoo in 1904. Harps had been used in the Middle Ages, but were not revived until the 1970s, when Emilio Cao used the instrument to accompany his compositions. Modern harpists have been encouraged by the use of the Celtic harp in Scotland, Ireland and Brittany, and include Quico Comesaña and Rodrigo Romaní.

=== Percussion ===
Percussion instruments include the tamboril, a snare drum that hangs from the player's belt and is played with two sticks. It is small, natural-skinned and features snares made usually of gut. Along with the bombo, a bass drum played with one stick, the tamboril is typically found as accompaniment to bagpipes. The pandeiro (Asturian: panderu) is a double-faced, square frame drum, similar to the Portuguese and Castilian adufe. It usually contains some beans that rattle inside. It is often played alongside the pandeireta-a round, single-faced drum with brass, iron, tin or tempered-steel rattles-, in small groups or by a single female singer. A pair of vieira shells (cunchas) are rubbed together, and accompany dancing. Tarrañolas (Asturian and Spanish: tejoletas) are strips of wood held between the fingers. Charrasco consists of a pole with a frame on the top adorned with tambourine rattles; it is played by rubbing a string along the pole with a stick. Other percussion instruments are canaveira and carraca.

=== Gaita ===
The term gaita may refer to a variety of different pipes, shawms, recorders, flutes and clarinets in different areas of Spain and Portugal, but in Galicia it refers to bagpipes, with the bag inflated with bellows or by a blowpipe. Outside of Galicia and Asturias, bagpipes are also traditionally played in other parts of Spain, including Aragon, Catalonia, León, Mallorca, Zamora and in Portugal in Minho, Trás-os-Montes and Estremadura.

Records show that the gaita was already common in the 13th century but suffered a decline in popularity in the 17th and 18th centuries until the 19th century renaissance of the instrument. The early 20th century saw another decline. Then, beginning in about the 1970s, a roots revival heralded another rebirth. The folk revival may have peaked in the late 1990s, with the release of acclaimed albums by Galician Carlos Núñez (A Irmandade Das Estrelas) and Asturian Hevia (Tierra De Nadie). Both releases broke records, and Tierra De Nadie sold more than a million copies.

In the 18th century, an important teaching school was opened in Asturias, created by José Remis Vega. Musicians of that era included the legendary Ramón García Tuero, while the 20th century produced performers like Vega's son, José Remis Ovalle and José Antonio García Suárez. The best-known modern Asturian player is Hevia, whose 1998 Tierra De Nadie was a landmark recording that smashes record sales and became the darling of the Spanish music media. Other modern performers and bands include Tejedor and Xuacu Amieva.

Traditional use include both solo performances or with a snare-drum known as tamboril (a wooden natural-skinned drum with gut snares), and the bombo, a bass drum. The Council of Ourense sponsors a bagpipe band, the Real Banda de Gaitas da Excma. Deputación de Ourense (Royal Pipe Band of the Council of Ourense). The Royal Pipe Band, founded by José Lois Foxo, uses blowpipe bagpipes in B flat, bagpipes with bellows tuned in F sharp, and a percussion section of snare drums, tenor drums, bass drums, tambourines and tarrañolas. Its repertoire covers both traditional Galician music as well as music from other Celtic countries. It is the source of some controversy in Galacian music, as the blowpipe bagpipes employed by the band are felt by critics to be too similar to Highland bagpipes rather than traditional Galacian gaitas. The drums are modern and not in a Galacian tradition, and the band marches military-style in parades, which is also not a tradition in Galacian gaita music.

Galician bagpipes come in three main varieties, though there are exceptions and unique instruments. These include the tumbal (B-flat), grileira (D) and redonda (C). Asturian bagpipes are usually played along with a tambor (snare drum). Asturian bagpipes usually have only one drone and follow a different fingering pattern.

==== Description ====
The player inflates the bag using his mouth through a tube fitted with a non-return valve. Air is driven into the chanter (Galician: punteiro; Asturian: punteru) with the left arm controlling the pressure inside the bag. The chanter has a double reed similar to a shawm or oboe, and a conical bore with seven finger-holes on the front. The bass drone (ronco or roncón) is situated on the player's left shoulder and is pitched two octaves below the key note of the chanter; it has a single reed. Some bagpipes have up to two more drones, including the ronquillo or ronquilla, which sticks out from the bag and plays an octave above the ronco, or the smaller chillón. This two extra drones are placed by the right arm of the player.

The finger-holes include three for the left hand and four for the right, as well as one at the back for the left thumb. The chanter's tonic is played with the top six holes and the thumb hole covered by fingers. Starting at the bottom and (in the Galician fingering pattern) progressively opening holes creates the diatonic scale. Using techniques like cross-fingering and half-holding, the chromatic scale can be created. With extra pressure on the bag, the reed can be played in a second octave, thus giving range of an octave and a half from tonic to top note. It is also possible to close the tone hole with the little finger of the right hand, thus creating a semitone below the tonic.

==== Songs ====
Tunes using the gaita are usually songs, with the voice either accompanying the instrumentation or taking turns with it.

The most common type is the muiñeira, found in both Asturias and Galicia, a sprightly 6/8 rhythm. Other 6/8 Galician tunes use different steps; they include the carballesa, ribeirana, redonda, chouteira and contrapaso.

The asturian alborada usually-instrumental tune, most often in 2/4, though sometimes 3/4, and is characterized by a series of descending turning phrases. It is used to begin a day's celebrations, and is played at sunrise. Russian composer Nikolai Rimsky-Korsakov included three asturian movements (two Alboradas and one Fandango Asturiano) in his famous orchestral work Capriccio espagnol, Op. 34, written in 1887.

The foliada is a joyful 3/4 jota-type song, often played at romerías (community gatherings at a local shrine).

== Songs ==
The oldest and best-known form of Galician music is the alalá, a form of chanting that has been associated with Galician nationalism. They share characteristics with those of Castile as well as the Celtic nations. Their origin is shrouded in mystery, with some scholars asserting Gregorian chants as a major source, while others fancily point to Greek or Phoenician rowing songs called alelohuías.

Alalás are arhythmic, and based on a single, short theme that repeats the melody, separated by instrumental bagpipes or a cappella interludes. Melodies are based on a continuous drone and are almost always diatonic. Over time, alalas have adapted to include choral polyphony which has added harmony and rhythms (most typically in 2/4 or 3/4 time) to the tradition. A distinct feature of alalas is that the first cadence is also the last. They end in an enlarged coda that fades into a sustained and undefined sound. In contrast to the typically slow alalá there are also swift songs called pandeirada.

Marching tunes (Galician: ruadas, Asturian: pasucáis, Spanish: pasacalles) are also known, as well as the local variation of jota.

Other Asturian dances include saltón, diana, respingu, pericote, fandango, pasodoble, marcha procesional, rebudixu, corri-corri, baile de los pollos, giraldilla and xiringüelu.

== Dances ==
Baile is the term for social dances, though there are also weapon dances like danzas de palillos (stick dances), danzas de espadas (sword dances) and danzas de arcillos (dances with decorated arches) a hallmark of Cantabrian folk tradition. Other popular dance songs in the area include the jota, pasacorredoiras (pasacalles, Asturian: pasucáis), and the imported fandango, mazurka, polka, rumba and pasodoble.

== Popular artists ==
- Luar na Lubre
- Milladoiro
- Carlos Núñez
- Treixadura
- Rosa Cedrón
- Malvela
- A Roda
- Fuxan Os Ventos
- Xabier Díaz
- Berrogüetto
- SonDeSeu
- Susana Seivane
- Cristina Pato
- Baiuca
- Mercedes Peón
- Tanxugueiras
- Rodrigo Cuevas

== Festivals ==
- Ortigueira's Festival of Celtic World
- Interceltic Festival of Morrazo
