= Baiuca =

Galician folktronica artist

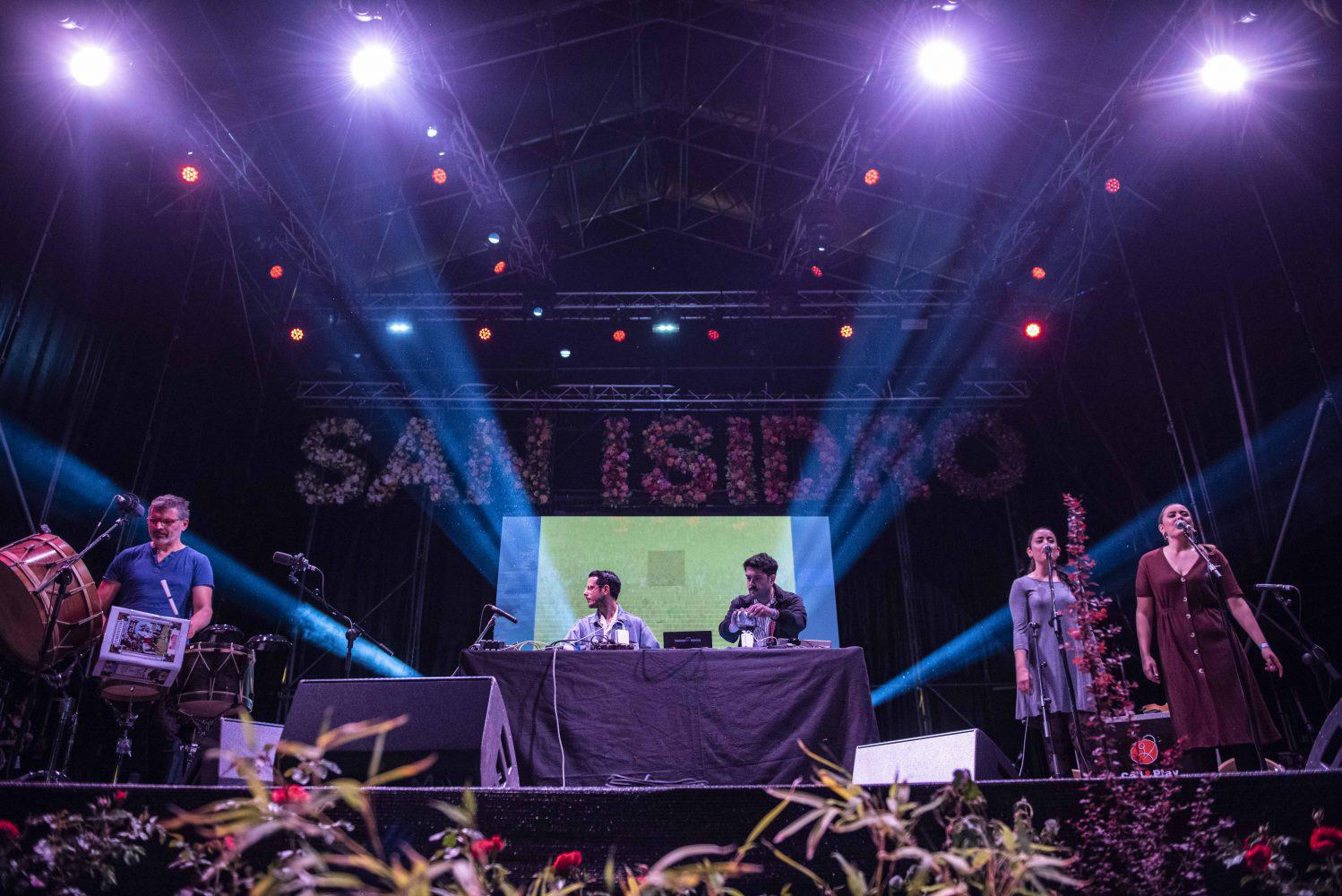

Background information
- Born: Alejandro Guillán Castaño; 1990 (age 35–36); Catoira, Spain
- Genres: Pop, electronic, Galician traditional music, folktronica
- Instruments: Vocals, gaita, flute, shells
- Years active: 2011–present
- Labels: Crispis (2014–2017); Raso (2018–present)
- Website: www.baiucamusic.com

Alejandro Guillán Castaño (born 1990 in Catoira), known artistically as Baiuca, is a Spanish and Galician musician. He used the stage name Alex Casanova until 2017, at which point he left behind the pop music style to innovate with a mixture of electronic music and Galician traditional music. This resulted in a style that some call folktronica. He currently resides in Madrid.

== Career ==
Baiuca began his musical trajectory as part of the group Alex Casanova, an electronic pop band in which he explored sounds closer to synth-pop. However, in 2017 Alejandro Guillán decided to go on a solo project that would allow him to connect more deeply with his Galician identity. This is how Baiuca was born, an alias that represents the mixture between the ancestral and the contemporary.

The name "baiuca" is a Galician term referring to an intimate and close space, and more specifically to small taverns or pubs where people gather to drink, eat, and socialize. These establishments are centers of social life, especially in rural areas or small Galician villages.

His music integrates traditional Galician instruments and elements, such as gaitas (bagpipes), tambourines, drums, and popular songs (muiñeiras, alalás, etc.), with electronic beats, synthesizers, and samples. This combination has resulted in an innovative sound that pays homage to the traditions of Galicia while projecting them to a global audience. His ability to innovate within folklore has made him an exponent of the new wave of electronic music with traditional roots.

== Awards and recognitions ==
In 2022, Baiuca won two Independent Music Awards (Premios MIN), one for Best Electronic Music Recording and another for Best Album in Galician. He has managed to take his music to international stages, participating in renowned festivals such as WOMAD, Sónar, and other events in Europe and Latin America.

Year	Award	Category	Candidate	Result	Ref.
2022	Premios MIN	Best Emerging Artist	Baiuca	Nominated	
2022	Premios MIN	Best Musical Production	Alejandro Guillán Castaño	Nominated	
2022	Premios MIN	Best Album	Embruxo	Nominated	
2022	Premios MIN	Best Album in Galician	Embruxo	Won	
2022	Premios MIN	Best Electronic Music Recording	Embruxo	Won	
2022	Premios MIN	Best Song	"Veleno"	Nominated	

== Discography ==
=== Antagonasia (2014) ===
1. "¿No puede ser?" 03:17
2. "Ni una sola vez" 03:37
3. "Ciudad Carmín" 03:52
4. "Todo va a estar bien" 04:42
5. "Bocadillo de Luna" (with Aries) 02:52
6. "Lulú" 02:44
7. "Yo no me muevo por dinero" 03:55
8. "Xeado de Limón" 02:33

=== Muiñeira (2017) ===
1. "Muiñeira"
2. "Xiabre"

=== Queimada (2017) ===
1. "Queimada"
2. "Faiado"

=== Mozas (2017) ===
1. "Mozas"
2. "Lamprea"

=== Muíño (2018) ===
1. "Muíño"

=== Morriña (2018) ===
1. "Morriña"

=== Solpor (2018) ===
His debut album received a great reception both in Spain and abroad. In this work, Baiuca establishes the foundations of his style, reinterpreting traditional Galician sounds through electronics. He compiled some of the singles he released previously while launching new songs.

1. "Muíño"
2. "Solaina"
3. "Morriña"
4. "Arrieiro"
5. "Muiñeira"
6. "Solpor"
7. "Mozas"
8. "Brétema"
9. "Arume"

=== Olvídame (2018) ===
1. "Olvídame" (with Aliboria)

=== Caroi (2019) ===
1. "Caroi" (with Aliboria)

=== Mangüeiro (2019) ===
1. "Mangüeiro" (with Aliboria)

=== Misturas (2019) ===
This EP includes collaborations with artists such as percussionist Xosé Lois Romero. It is a work that reinforces his exploration of Galician roots and expands his aesthetic proposal.

1. "Olvídame" 3:48 (with Aliboria)
2. "Caroi" 3:35
3. "Toutón" 4:39
4. "Mangüeiro" 4:48
5. "Liñares" 3:10

=== Fisterra (2019) ===
1. "Fisterra" (with Carlangas)

=== Caravel (2019) ===
1. "Caravel" (with Nita)

=== Paisaxes (2020) ===
1. "Fisterra" 4:14
2. "Caravel" 4:38
3. "Fisterra (El Búho Dub)" 4:18
4. "Caravel (Uji Remix)" 5:45

=== Adélia (2020) ===
1. "Adélia" 4:18
2. "Adélia (Yeahman Remix)" 4:38
3. "Adélia (Ohxala Remix)" 6:17

=== Luar (2021) ===
1. "Luar" (with Lilaina)

=== Veleno (2021) ===
1. "Veleno" (with Rodrigo Cuevas)

=== Meigallo (2021) ===
1. "Meigallo" (with Lilaina)

=== Embruxo (2021) ===
In this album, Baiuca delves even deeper into the mystical and magical aspects of Galician culture. He is inspired by themes such as meigas (witches) and the mythical landscape of Galicia, taking his sound to a more atmospheric and immersive level.

1. "Meigallo"
2. "Veleno"
3. "Embruxo"
4. "Luar"
5. "Cortegada"
6. "Romaría"
7. "Conxuro"
8. "Lavandeira"
9. "Diaño"
10. "Lobeira"

=== Solstício (2022) ===
1. "Solstício" (with Carlos Núñez)

=== Paxaro do Demo (2022) ===
1. "Paxaro do Demo" (with Xoel López)

=== Diamante (2022) ===
1. "Diamante" (with Alba Reche)

=== Diamante / La Mare (2023) ===
1. "Diamante" (with Alba Reche)
2. "La Mare" (with Alba Reche)

=== Vai Tu (2023) ===
1. "Vai Tu" (with Leilía)

=== Barullo (2024) ===
1. "Navajitas" (with Xurxo Fernandes & Felisa Segade)
2. "Sísamo" (with Antía Ameixeiras)
3. "Alentejo"
4. "Ribeirana" (with Lilaina)
5. "Barullo" (with Felisa Segade)
6. "Sementei" (with Antía Ameixeiras)
7. "MonteViso" (with Carlangas)
8. "PAEQB"
9. "Xoia" (with Antía Ameixeiras)
10. "Rachafaldra"

=== Appearances on compilations ===
Year	Title	Compilation
2013	"Xeado de limón"	Bababum "Vacacións"
2013	"Como Mola!"	Os Bolechas "Fan unha banda"

== Videography ==
Year	Title	Director
2015	¡No Puede Ser?	Angel Pardal
2017	Solaina	Adrián Canoura
2017	Ribeiro	Adrián Canoura
2018	Camiños	Adrián Canoura
2018	Xiabre	Adrián Canoura
2018	Muíño	Adrián Canoura
