= Tejedor =

Tejedor is a Spanish occupational surname meaning "weaver". It may refer to:

- Ángela Molina Tejedor (b. 1955), Spanish actress
- Carlos Tejedor (politician) (1817–1903), Argentine jurist and politician
- Francisco Tejedor (b. 1966), Colombian boxer
- Ernesto Valverde Tejedor, Spanish manager
- Ethan Aramis Tejedor, United States Lawyer
- Luis Herrero-Tejedor Algar (b. 1955), Spanish politician
- Marta Tejedor (b. 1968), Spanish football coach
- Mónica Molina Tejedor (b. 1968), Spanish actress
- Ramón Tejedor (b. 1955), Spanish politician
- Romnick Sarmenta Tejedor (b. 1972), Filipino actor

== See also ==
- Carlos Tejedor (disambiguation)
- Tejedor (band)
- Tejedor top shell
