= Ruma Barbero =

Spanish cartoonist and musician (born 1971)

- Born: Rumaldo Antón Barbero de Diego; 3 February 1971 (age 55); Somió, Spain
- Genres: Folk music, Asturian music
- Occupations: Musician, comic book artist, graphic designer

Rumaldo Antón Barbero de Diego (born 3 February 1971, Somió, Gijón, Spain), better known as Ruma Barbero, is a Spanish comic book artist and musician. Between 1990 and 1995 he studied a bachelor's in Fine Arts, specializing in sculpture, at the University of Salamanca.

== Career ==
Ruma Barbero formed in 1991 the music band Felpeyu along with the also comic book artist Ígor Medio. The band was formed in Salamanca, where they both were studying Fine Arts. The Galician brothers Castor and Félix Castro also were part of the band in its beginnings. In the band, Barbero was the percussionist. He also collaborated in the musical field with the group Los Ciquitrinos.

In 1996, he co-founded the publishing house Cactus Comics, in which Ígor Medio, Javi Rodríguez, Andrea Parissi and Son also participated. Cactus Comics published some of the most outstanding Asturian comics at the time, such as "Little Memo", "Los Aguarones", "Anselmo Ensombras" and "Love Gun". He also collaborated with the magazine El Llapiceru and with the newspaper Les Noticies with a strip in which he gave his peculiar vision of Asturian affairs entitled "Marcianaes". Amongst Barbero's collaborations with the media, beyond his comics, one can highlight his work with the newspapers El Comercio, El Diariu Independiente, Güei, the magazine Interferencies and the Anuario de la Música Asturiana, in which he published the first known photo-novel in Asturian language.

Between 1996 and 1998, he was a high school teacher. Together with Xosé Antón García-Sampedro, best known as Son, he won some regional comic awards such as "El Llapiceru". As a graphic designer, one can highlight his designs for the covers of the albums of Felpeyu, La Bandina, DRD, Verdasca, Blima, Tuenda, Duerna, Música Tradicional d'Allande, Música Tradicional en conceyu L.lena or Música Tradicional en concechu Quirós. He is also the author of several theatre posters for the company Nun Tris, and for concerts and music festivals.

In 2009, he won the Alfonso Iglesias Comic Prize for "Manzajú", an autobiographical graphic novel. Halfway between comic and graphic design is Los Ciquitrinos's Comic-CD "Faciendo l'indio" (2009) of which he is also author. Since 2011 he's published the digital fanzine Aguantando Cachones, with unpublished work and a compilation of previous works. He is a "founding member" (miembro fundidor) of the satirical web magazine Fundición Príncipe de Astucias (Prince of Astuteness Foundry, as a reference of the Prince of Asturias Foundation) since September 2012.

In November 2012 he published "La Chelita. El Salvador 1992", a graphic novel based on the experiences and testimonies of international aid workers and veterans of the Salvadoran guerrilla. With this work, Ruma Barbero won the prize for best book in Asturian in 2012, awarded by the Tertulia Malory. One year later, he published "Aguantando cachones", which collected the comics that were presented in his blog from 2011 until July 2013.

He also acted as a lyricist for bands such as Felpeyu, Los Ciquitrinos, Tejedor, Blima, Pandereteres de Fitoria or the Aire project.

== Awards ==
- Comarca de la Sidra Prize of Comic in Asturian (for Marcianaes, 2003).
- Alfonso Iglesias Prize in 2009 for Manzajú (Suburbia Ediciones, 2010).
- Award to best book in Asturian in 2012, for «La Chelita», awarded by Tertulia Malory.
