= Josefa de Bastavales =

Spanish percussionist (1932–2024)

- Born: Josefa Juncal Barreiro; 20 July 1932
- Died: 2 October 2024 (aged 92)
- Occupations: Musician, farmer
- Spouse: d. 1998

Josefa de Bastavales (Tordoya, A Coruña, 20 July 1932 – 2 October 2024) was a Spanish tambourine player who performed with Manu Chao.

== Career ==
She was born in the hamlet of Santaia, 30 km north of Santiago de Compostela. She started playing the tambourine when she was ten years old, "in those village parties."

When she was fifteen years old, she moved with her parents and siblings to the village of Bemil, in the parish of Bastavales (in the municipality of Brion, 16 km southwest of Santiago de Compostela), where her parents worked as tenant farmers. She was a farmer by profession and a seamstress by hobby. Despite moving away from Tordoya ―60 km away―, Josefa kept in touch with her native parish and frequently visited its pilgrimages. A neighbor who played the accordion at religious celebrations in the church of Bastavales asked her to accompany him with the tambourine. Josefa learned to play the accordion from him and began to practice singing accompanied by the tambourine. Josefa was self-taught in the world of music, possessing many skills in playing various musical instruments and singing.

In 1974, she participated in a contest on the television program Luar (on the channel TVG), where she won a prize. Fifteen years later, in 1989, she won another prize on the same show.

Josefa participated in several renowned groups both nationally and internationally. Among them were Cristina Pato (1980-), Susana Seivane (1976-), Fuxan os Ventos, and the Irish folk music group The Chieftains.

== Manu Chao ==
This resident of Brion was encouraged by the French musician Manu Chao (1961-) and had her best musical experience performing with him at the International Music Festival of France. She also performed with him in several concerts in Barcelona.

At first, it was hard for me. My husband had recently died, but once I started touring with them, I felt alive again. It was the best medicine. [...] The truth is, I always felt very well taken care of because I was the oldest in the group.

— Josefa de Bastavales

In 1999, the French musician Manu Chao organized a large pulpada at the house that his father ―Ramón Chao (1935-)― owned in Bastavales (300 m north of Josefa's house). There were over thirty guests, including Xurxo Souto, Os Diplomáticos de Monte Alto, José Manuel Pereiro, and Pinto d'Herbón. "They came to get me, we made food, and everything ended in a party, and that's where a great friendship was born."

As she saw him from time to time, she jokingly greeted him with: "Oh, here comes the disappeared one!" Manu Chao used this nickname as inspiration for his song Desaparecido, which he composed in Josefa's kitchen.

Later, Manu Chao invited her to participate in some home recordings (with his portable recording studio). When Josefa's husband died, he invited her to sing and play the tambourine in Lyon (France). She had never traveled further than León (Spain). He later called her to every concert he did in the region: Lalín, Pontevedra, A Coruña, Costa da Morte... Eventually, she participated in a tour with Manu Chao and his musicians ― always accompanied by her daughters― that took her for nine months across Spain and France.

Josefa de Bastavales sang with the musician at the concert he gave in the summer of 2001 in Lalín, the capital of the Deza region. In the recording studio, Josefa de Bastavales did not feel so comfortable; she preferred the stage.

In 2002, Josefa de Bastavales had a heart attack, from which she was slow to recover.
