= Susana Seivane (album) =

Studio album by Susana Seivane
- Released: 1999
- Recorded: 1999
- Genre: Folk
- Length: 43:42
- Label: Green Linnet
- Producer: Rodrigo Romani

Susana Seivane chronology
Susana Seivane (1999)	Alma de buxo (2002)

Susana Seivane is the debut album by Galician gaita (bagpipes) player Susana Seivane, released in 1999.

== History ==
The album has a wide diversity of time-signatures. The arrangements are done by Rodrigo Romani of Milladoiro, Brais Maceiras and Seivane. This is her most traditional album till now, with no rock elements, and many traditional songs.

Seivane sang two songs (tracks 5 and 12) the first solo, the second with Sonia Lebedynski, sung in Galician. The liner notes contain a photograph of her playing bagpipes in a procession in folk costume at the age of three. From a technical point of view "Xota dos 28 puntos" has the most complex playing technique. The liner notes are in Spanish and English.

== Reception ==
Professional ratings
Review scores
Source	Rating
Allmusic	2.5/5 stars

Music critic Peggy Latkovich wrote in her Allmusic review "... her playing is confident with a fine rhythmic sweep. The simple arrangements, though a bit dry at times, keep the spotlight on her performance. Since the nasal moan of Galician pipes is an acquired taste for many, this can be seen as a plus or a minus... There's a good variety of tune types, from traditional jotas (dance tunes) to newly composed waltzes and rumbas... Seivane shows a lot of promise. It will be interesting to watch her develop as an artist."

== Track listing ==
1. "Jotabe" (Melo Suarez)
2. "Taramundi/ Alen" (Traditional, Suarez)
3. "Xota de Ninodaguia/Muineira do Muino de Peizas/Polca para Erica" (Beito Romero, Raul #Galego, Anton Varela)
4. "Pasacorredoiras de Ponteareas" (Traditional)
5. "Alala de Vilalba" (Lyrics: Traditional/Music: Rodrigo Romani)
6. "Sabelina" (Seivane)
7. "Marcha procesional dos Mato" (Unknown)
8. "Fonsagrada" (Traditional)
9. "Xota dos 28 puntos" (Traditional)
10. "Maneo (song)" (Unknown)
11. "A cotula" (Unknown)
12. "Savinao/Pasodoble de Pousada" (Traditional)
13. "3 Muineiras (do Vello Rilo/de Manuel do Pazo/de Ambite)" (Traditional)

== Personnel ==
- Susana Seivane – bagpipes in B, bagpipes in C, djembe, drum, tambourine, darbuka, vocals
- Brais Maceiras – diatonic accordion, tin whistle
- Rodrigo Romani – bouzouki, acoustic guitar, zither, ocarina, keyboards, marinba
- Kim Garcia – bass guitar, double bass
- Beto Niebla – drum
- Anxo Pintos – zanfona/hurdy-gurdy
- Laura Quintilan – violin
- Xose Luz – traverse flute
- Xose Ferreiros – oboe, bodhran, rattles
- Sonia Lebedynski – vocals
