= Felpeyu =

Spanish folk music group

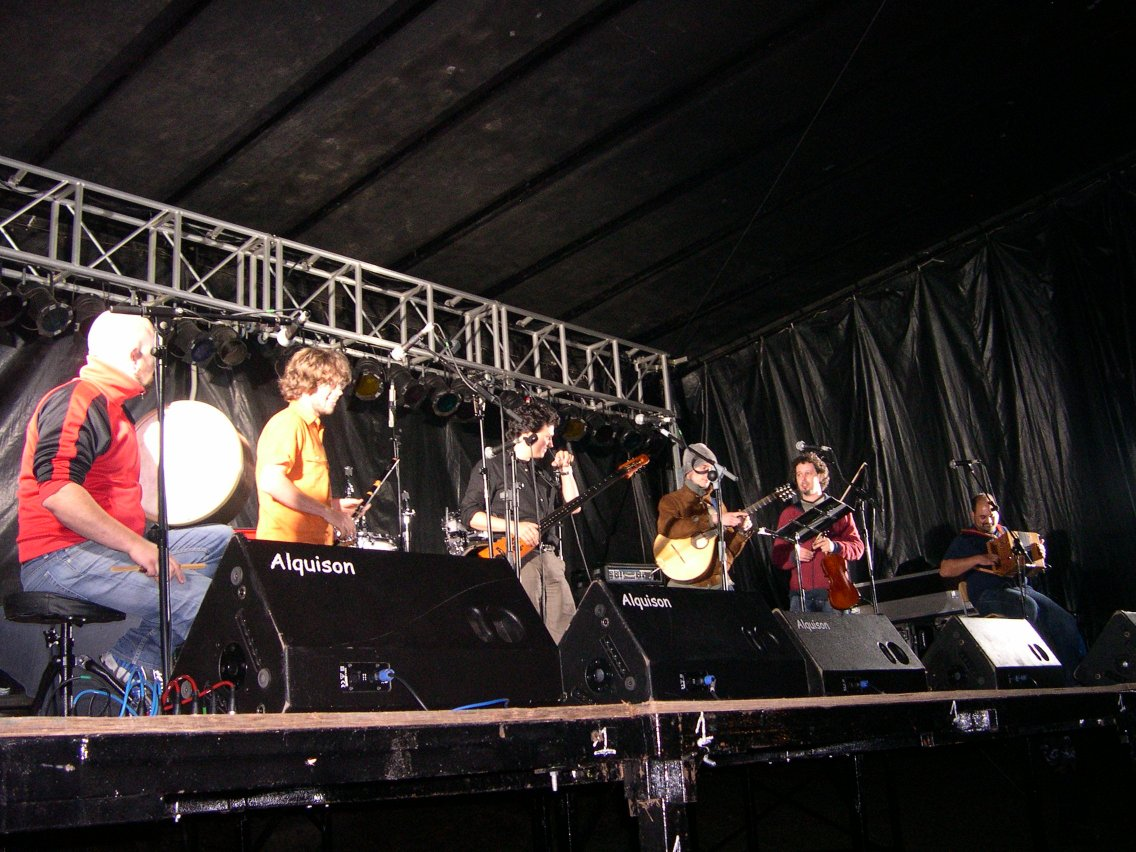
- Felpeyu in 2007

Background information
- Origin: Salamanca, Spain
- Genres: Folk; Celtic; Asturian
- Years active: 1991–present
- Labels: Tierra Discos, FonoAstur
- Members: Ruma Barbero; Diego Pangua; Lisardo Prieto; Aníbal Menchaca; Luis Nicolás; Alberto Ablanedo
- Past members: Ígor Medio †; Carlos Redondo †; Xuan Nel Expósito; Luis Senén Fernández; Elías García †; Moisés Suárez; Bree Delian
- Website: www.felpeyu.com

Felpeyu is a Spanish musical group formed in 1991, playing traditional Asturian music as well original compositions based on traditional structures and rhythms.

The band was formed in Salamanca, Spain, by founding members Igor Medio, Ruma Barbero, and the Galician brothers Castor and Félix Castro. The band enjoyed early success within Spain, and has subsequently toured internationally with numerous performances in Europe and Australia. Over the years Felpeyu has also released five studio albums.

== History ==
The group's first recording was the demo Fuxide Oricios in 1993. The same year, Felpeyu won third prize in the Vilagarcía d'Arousa Folk Bands Competition, and consequently contributed two tracks to the compilation V Festival de Música Folk Galega (CD, 1993 Edicions Discográficas Galegas).

In 1994 the group released its first album, titled Felpeyu and published by FonoAstur. At this early stage the band's repertoire included both Galician and Asturian music, whereas the focus later shifted solely to the Asturian. The second album, Tierra, was released in 1997 and became Asturian Recording of the Year.

During the following years, the band toured throughout Spain and other European countries. In 2000, Felpeyu toured Australia, with 30 performances at major Australian festivals. During the international tour Felpeyu recorded Live Overseas. A second Australian tour took place in 2001.

In 2003 Felpeyu created its own label, Tierra Discos. The first release on the label was the album Yá!, distributed in Spain and Australasia. That same year, Felpeyu played at the annual WOMADadelaide festival of world music and dance in Adelaide, South Australia.

On 24 June 2006, as Felpeyu was travelling from a performance in Corvera to another venue in Barcelona, the group's van overturned on the road. Band members Igor Medio and Carlos Redondo were killed, and four other members were seriously injured. The accident shocked the Spanish folk music community, and the group remained inactive for eleven months.

In May 2007, Felpeyu began performing again with the addition of Dudu Bridge on bass and lead vocals. The following year saw a number of changes to the group's lineup: Senen Luis Fernández replaced Dudu Bridge on bass and lead vocals, Borja Baragaño (Asturian bagpipes, flutes) replaced Diego Pangua and Elias Garcia (bouzouki) replaced Fernando Oyagüez. 2008 also saw the release of the group's most recent album, Canteros.

== Discography ==
- 1994 — Felpeyu
- 1997 — Tierra
- 2000 — Live Overseas
- 2003 — Yá!
- 2008 — Canteros
- 2017 - Cerquina
