= SonDeSeu =

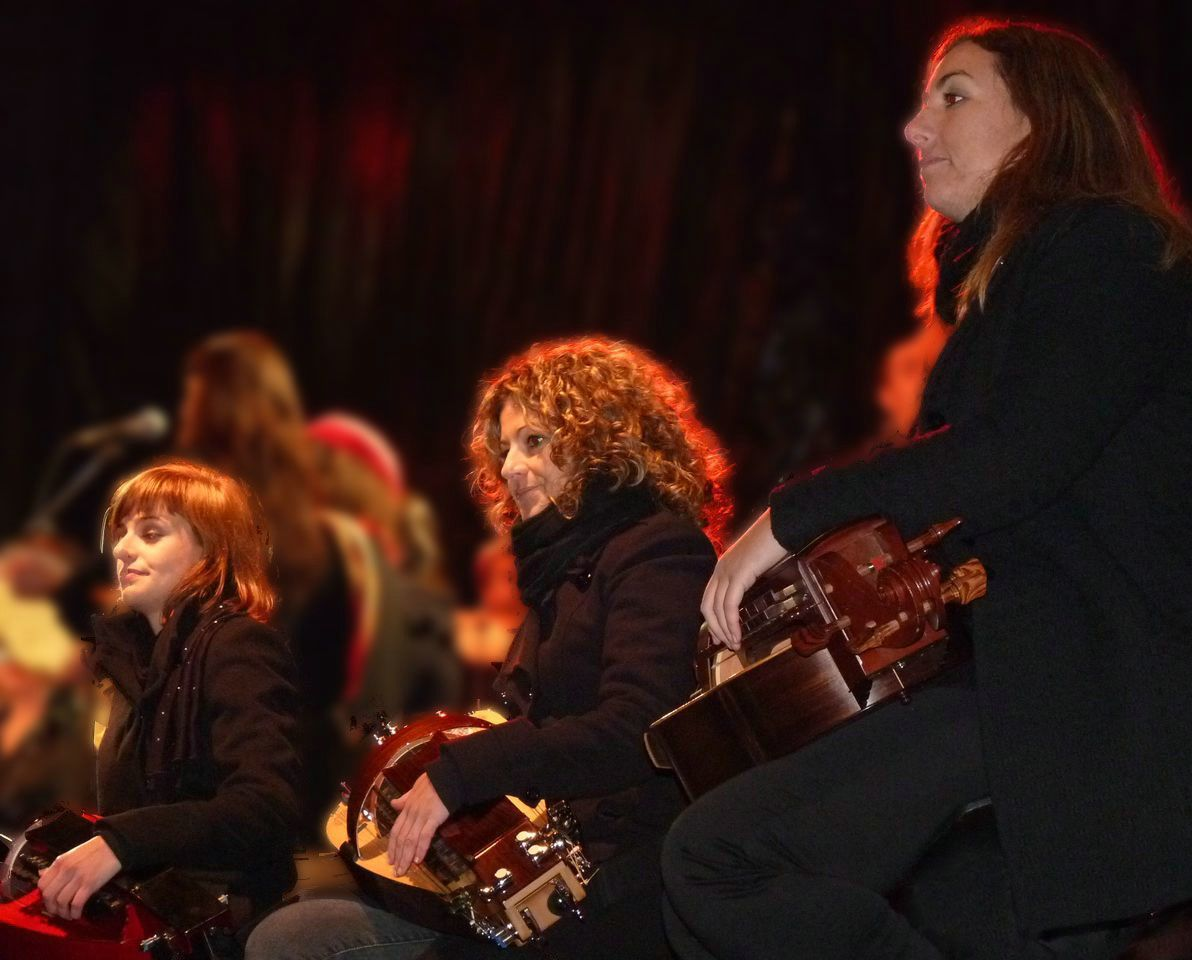
- SonDeSeu live at Lugo, July 2015

Background information
- Origin: Vigo, Galicia, Spain
- Genres: Folk; traditional music; galician music
- Years active: 2001–present
- Website: www.sondeseu.org

SonDeSeu is the first folk and traditional music orchestra from Galicia, Spain, and it is also considered to be one of the first European contemporary folk orchestras. It is constituted by 53 members and conducted by Rodrigo Romaní.

Its repertoire consists of pieces from the oral tradition of the popular galician music, especially arranged for the group by the members themselves, mainly the heads of the different sections, which include galician bagpipes, percussion, hurdy-gurdies, fiddles, requintas (traditional galician transverse flutes), vocals, harps and plucked strings.

== Trajectory ==
It was born in 2001 in the former department of Traditional Music of the Municipal School of Arts and Trades of Vigo, known today as the Municipal School of Traditional and Folk Music of Vigo, ETRAD. This singular experience pursues the fusion between highly specialized education, experience on the stage, and making music in community. Since then, their trajectory has continued ascending both in Spain and in the international panorama.

SonDeSeu has recorded four studio albums: "Mar de Vigo" (2004), "Trastempo" (2007), "Barlovento" (2010) and "Danzas Brancas" (2013).

Besides Spain, it has also performed in several concerts in countries such as France, Italy, Ireland, Portugal and Finland. The live concerts are a tribute to the recovery of the oral patrimony and its integration into the modern urban life, where the public, integrated by people of different ages and cultural origins, take part actively.

Currently, in collaboration with the local government of the city of Vigo, SonDeSeu leads the project Enfo (European Network of Folk Orchestras), which encourages the creation of new European folk orchestras, to consolidate a stable exchange and participation network.

In 2011 it obtained the Galicia Critics Award.

== Discography ==
- Mar de Vigo (2004):
1. "Mar de Vigo"
2. "Grixoa"
3. "Liñares"
4. "Noite"
5. "Maurus"
6. "Rumbas de Monzo e Vergara"
7. "A pequerrecha"
8. "Carmiña no Berbés"
- Trastempo (2007)
1. "Alén"
2. "A camposa"
3. "Valse de Arousa"
4. "Foliada de Nostián"
5. "De Mostad a Millares"
6. "Costureiriña"
7. "Nun cacho dun anaco"
8. "Namoreir@"
9. "O paraíso"
10. "Nena morena"
11. "Ramanalama"
12. "O cantar que nunca acaba"
- Barlovento (2010)
1. "Melchor de Cumieira"
2. "Alalá de Padrón"
3. "Mencer no camiño"
4. "Aires de Moscarnoia"
5. "Romance de Mirabella" ft. Rosa Cedrón
6. "O Galo de Leirado"
7. "Canto de Arrieiro na Lamosa"
8. "Tradiculata"
9. "Nadal de Caroi e Reis de Rinlo"
10. "Espadelada de Penosiños"
11. "Barlovento"
- Danzas Brancas (2013)

In collaboration with vasque trikitilari Kepa Junkera.

1. "Folerpas e Danzas brancas"
2. "Insua"
3. "O Rillachavos"
4. "Sil lenzo"
5. "Rumbas de Marcial e Barciademera"
6. "Xota de Cortellas"
7. "Pasodobre das Anduriñas"
8. "Rosa Desvairada"
9. "O Mandil"

== Members ==
At present, SonDeSeu is constituted by the following musicians:

- Conductor: Rodrigo Romaní
- Harps (Head: Rodrigo Romaní): Inés Lorenzo, Laura Barreiro, Olalla Vidal, Marta Barreiro, Lorena Reinaldo, Beatriz Martínez.
- Vocal (Head: Javier Feijoó "Chisco"): Mª José Balado, Anaïs Barbier, Xela Conde, Ana Domínguez, Eva González, Sara Malvido, Rosa Martínez, Mª Mercedes Pazos, Leticia R. Pais, Teresa Santamaría, Itziar Solar, Raquel Valcarce
- Galician bagpipes (Head: Xaquín Xesteira): Sito Muiños, Xose L. Sanromán, Marina Vigo, Antonio Prieto, Ana Pereira
- Requintas (Head: Xosé Liz): Pilar Vieira, Teresa Varela, Xaime Rebollo.
- Hurdy-Gurdys (Head: Anxo Pintos): Sandra Fernández, Paula García, Paz Martínez, Iván Costa, Liliana Carro, María Muras, Teresa Gómez.
- Percussion (Head: Xaquín Xesteira): Anxo Pardo, Marilú Campos, Eva González, Xavier Figueroa, Julia Feijoo
- Fiddles (Head: Alfonso Franco): Begoña Riobó, Paco Táboas, Nuria Zunzunegui, Jose Varela, Felipe Rodicio, Ismael Cabaleiro
- Bouzoukis: (Head: Xosé Liz): Marta M. Valladares, Xosé Liz, Samuel Soto

== See also ==
- Galician traditional music
