= Uxia =

Uxia may refer to:

- Uxía (born 1962), Galician singer Uxía Senlle
- Uxía Martínez Botana, Galician double bass player
- Uxia, a synonym for Clemensia, a genus of moths in the family Erebidae
