= O Berro Seco =

Studio album by Milladoiro
- Released: 1980
- Genre: Celtic
- Label: Doblon

Milladoiro chronology
A Galicia de Maeloc (1979)	O Berro Seco (1980)	Milladoiro 3 (1982)

O Berro Seco (The Dry Shriek) is the second album by Milladoiro, released in 1980.

== Insert ==
Like the group's first album, it includes an inscription on the inside cover in the Galician language:

"Saturnino Cuiñas foi figura moi importante dentro do movimento cultural galego, home que nunca rexeitou do noso idioma, débense á súa laboura de folklorista moitas das pezas que compoñen o que hoxe en día chamamos música tradicional; traballador en tódolos eidos que tiveron o pobo como fin, foi tamen o inventor dunha fermosa tradicion.

Na capela da Santa Cruz na parroquia de Cesullas, a saída da misa os homes agachados collíanse das mans e do tempo que as suas figuras erguíanse, as voces xuntábanse nun berro que pouco iba medrando deica rematar nun solo aturuxo rachado de súpeto pola orden de Saturnino. Iste berro que simbolizaba a unión de moitos homes nun mismo esforzo recibeu como bautizo o nome de
O BERRO

SECO"

This roughly translates to:

"Saturnino Cuiñas was a very important figure in the Galician cultural movement who never turned his back on our language. It's thanks to his efforts in folklore that we have many of the pieces that are today considered traditional; he was a contributor in all such fields and was the inventor of a beautiful tradition.

In the Chapel of the Holy Cross in the parish of Cesullas, at the end of mass the men, bowed, leaning their hands, and when the figures exit, their voices joined in a cry that grew until it ended in a cracked shriek out of a sudden, in the order of Saturnino. This cry symbolized the union of many men under the same effort, which I baptize with the name of
THE DRY

SHRIEK"

== Track listing ==
1. O Berro Seco ("The Dry Shriek")
2. A Cruz da Vella ("The Old Lady's Cross")
3. Fis Terra (from Latin Finisterrae, "End of Earth")
4. Muiñeira Vella de Mordomo
5. Na Cova da Barxa ("In the Cave of A Barxa")
6. Unha Noite no Santo Cristo ("A Night in Santo Cristo")
7. Polca Dos Campaneiros ("Polka of the Bell Founders")
8. Caraveliño Colorado ("Red Carnation")
9. A Furoca ("The Little Hole")
10. Brincadeiro
