= Mares de tempo =

Studio album by Susana Seivane
- Released: May 3, 2004
- Recorded: 2004
- Genre: Folk
- Length: 53:23
- Label: Do Fol
- Producer: Rodrigo Romani

Susana Seivane chronology
Alma de buxo (2002)	Mares de tempo (2004)	Os soños que volven (2009)

Mares de tempo is an album by Galician gaita (bagpipes) player Susana Seivane, released in 2004.

== History ==
Seivane's third record, in which some well-known Galician musicians participated, is supplemented by a DVD that contains footage of her on stage and off. Mares de tempo is a title that has been taken from the work of the Galician poet Celso Emilio Ferreiro: "Longa noite de pedra". It is a reflection on the passage of time and its effects.

The song, "Muneira de Alen", is one that Seivane had recorded on her previous album, This time it is given a heavier treatment. Almost all the tracks can be described as folk-rock and for the first time there is no acoustic guitar. The tunes and songs mostly come from Gallician Spain.

== Track listing ==
1. "Retrato de Fiona" (Xurxo Iglesias)
2. "Androrina Marineira" (Henrique Otero)
3. "Segrado" (Sabela Orgueira, Seivane)
4. "Olla Como se Peneira" (Xose Lois Romero Cajigal)
5. "Comeco do Verao - Polca do Ulla" (Heleno dos Oito Baixos)
6. "Muneira de Alen" (Traditional)
7. "Xota de Vilabol" (Traditional)
8. "Xota de Linares" (Traditional)
9. "Mazurca de Comptor" (Guadi Galego, Christian Desnos)
10. "Doce Dias" (Ivan Laxe)
11. "Mina Virxe, Meu Amor" (Guille, Seivane)
12. "Namorandome" (Roberto Grandal, Seivane)

== Personnel ==
- Susana Seivane – bagpipes, percussion, vocals
- Brais Maceiras – diatonic accordion
- Carlos Freire – drum, darbuka, shaker
- Ivan Laxe – electric bass
- Teresa Sayas – drums
- Xurxo Iglesias – bouzouki
- Rodrigo Romani – harp
