= Alma de buxo =

Alma de Buxo

Studio album by Susana Seivane
- Released: November 5, 2002
- Recorded: 2002
- Genre: Folk
- Length: 47:26
- Label: Boa Cor
- Producer: Susana Seivane

Susana Seivane chronology
Susana Seivane (1999)	Alma de Buxo (2002)	Mares de tempo (2004)

Alma de Buxo is an album by Galician gaita (bagpipes) player Susana Seivane, released in 2002.

== History ==
With her second album Alma de Buxo produced by herself, under the artistic supervision of Rodrigo Romaní, Seivane consolidated her position as a Galician musician in the field of folk music. In this album, important artists such as Uxía Senlle, Kepa Junkera and Rodrigo Romaní have made their contributions. A contribution from her grandfather Xosé Seivane is notable. As an innovation, in this piece of work she introduced drums and bass guitar and included some of her own compositions. During 2001 she was one of the finalists in the 2001 Indie Awards, which are awarded by the AFIM each year, in the category of best artist in Contemporary Music worldwide.

In 2003 she has collaborated with the well-known Breton bagpipe band, the Bagad Kemper, in recording their last album Sud-Ar Su. She toured with the band and appeared in concerts, in Paris (Nuit Celtique, March 2004), in Nantes (Nuits Celtes, June 2004), in Quimper (Festival de Cornouaille, July 2004) and she also appeared with them at the Festival Interceltique, in Lorient (August 2004).

The title means "Soul of the boxwood tree". It is a play on words, meaning the wooden bagpipe chanters that she plays, and also Seivane herself running through the forest on the cover art. This has a more powerful sound than her first album, with folk-rock arrangements and an orchestra playing a rumba on one track. Track 11 has Seivane's father, Xose Manuel Seivane playing bagpipes in a house session, with background cheering and laughing, followed without a break by a folk-rock band version of the same tune. There are two songs, sung in Galician. The song "Muineira de Alen" includes a female chorus.

== Reception ==
Professional ratings
Review scores
Source	Rating
Allmusic	4.5/5 stars

Music critic Chris Nickson wrote in an Allmusic review "... Seivane takes a great leap on this record... The first real indication that something different is happening here comes with "Roseiras de Abril," featuring a surprisingly strong Seivane vocal on her own song... She's not afraid to expand her tradition, but also explore it properly... She finishes with an unaccompanied pipe piece, a processional and a muiñera that highlights the beauty of her instrument... with this record, she's done something very beautiful."

== Track listing ==
1. "Vai de Polcas" (Trad, Presedo, Vaamonde) – 3:48
2. "A Farandula" (Trad) – 2:53
3. "Sainza" (Riofrio) (Seivane, Magoia Bodega) – 4:07
4. "Roseiras de Abril" (Susana Seivane, Uxia Senlle) – 4:01
5. "Xoanina" (Pepe Vaamonde) – 3:00
6. "Rumba Para Susi" (Campos) – 4:28
7. "Vals Breton - Muineira Picado" (Trad) – 4:53
8. "Na Terra de Transancos" (Toxeiro) – 3:22
9. "Muineira de Alen" (Trad) – 2:30
10. "Ti e Mais Eu" (Roberto Grandal) – 3:13
11. "Chao (Curuxeiras)" (solo version) (Xose Manuel Seivane) – 3:00
12. "Chao (Curuxeiras)" (band version) (Xose Manuel Seivane) – 3:27
13. "Marche Processional Dos Cinco de Galicia (Aturuxeira)" (Trad, Pepe Vaamonde) – 4:35

== Personnel ==
- Susana Seivane – bagpipes, vocals
- Carlo Castro – drums, percussion
- Brais Maceiras – diatonic accordion
- Xurgo Iglesias – bouzouki
- Ivan Laxe – electric bass
- Juan Cabezon – banjo
- Alvaro Lamas – steel guitar
- Xavier Cedron – violin
- Rodrigo Romani – acoustic guitar, harp
- Roberto Grandal – piano accordion, piano
- Magoia Bodega – bagpipes
- Dani Sisto – acoustic guitar
- Kim Garcia – bass
- Kepa Junkera – trikitixa
- Xavier Gastanaduy – Spanish guitar
- Xose Manuel Seivane – bagpipes
- The orchestra "Agrupacion Musical Harmonia" – conducted by Xose Luis Represas) plays on "Rumba Para Susi"
- The female vocal ensemble "Sete Saias" – Lola de Ribeira, Olga Kirk, Guadi Gelago, Sonia Lebedynski, Uxia Pedreira, Uxia Senlle sing on "Muineira de Alen"
