= Berrogüetto =

Galician folk band

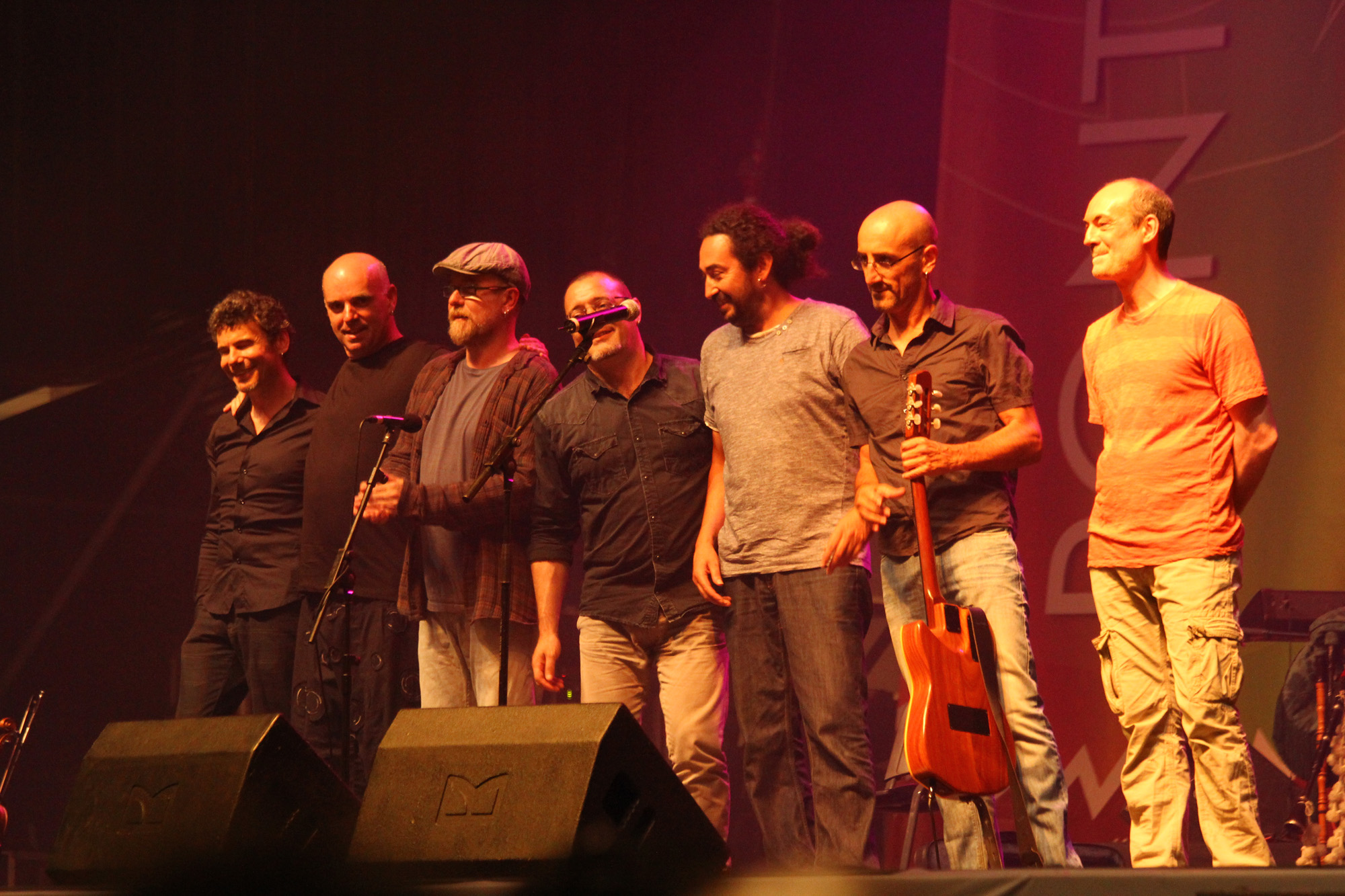

Background information
- Origin: Galicia, Spain
- Genres: Folk
- Years active: 1995 – 2014
- Labels: BOA
- Members: Quico Comesaña (1995 – 2014) Santiago Cribeiro (1995 – 2014); Quin Farinha (1995 – 2014); Guillermo Fernandez (1995 – 2014); Isaac Palacin (1995 – 2014) Anxo Pintos (1995 – 2014)
- Website: berroguetto.com

Berrogüetto was a folk band from Galicia, formed in the spring of 1995. They were signed to BOA records and released their first album Navicularia in 1996, going on to receive various awards.

The name Berrogüetto was born when the components of this artistic project met in Vigo to form and give a name to the new grouping. The name is a neologism, that has a triple origin "Berro" meaning "scream" or "shout" in Galician, "Güeto" from the word "ghetto" and, finally, "Soweto", the South African district where the fight against apartheid started. The amalgamation of these three names, of these three semantic ideas, is the word Berrogüetto, that would come to mean the shout of the ghetto - the oppressed ones. The group was disbanded in February 2014.

== Members ==
- Anxo Pinto - Hurdy-gurdy, violin, saxophone, flute, piano, bagpipes
- Isaac Palacín - Percussion
- Quico Comesaña - Bouzouki and harp
- Quin Farinha - Violin
- Santiago Cribeiro - Accordion and piano
- Guillermo Fernandez - Guitar and bass
- Guadi Galego - Vocals and bagpipes

== Discography ==
=== Albums ===
- 1996: Navicularia
- 1998: La Música Con El Sol (unpublished)
- 1999: Viaxe por Urticaria
- 2001: Hepta
- 2006: 10.0
- 2010: Kosmogonías

== See also ==
- Galician traditional music
