= Uxía =

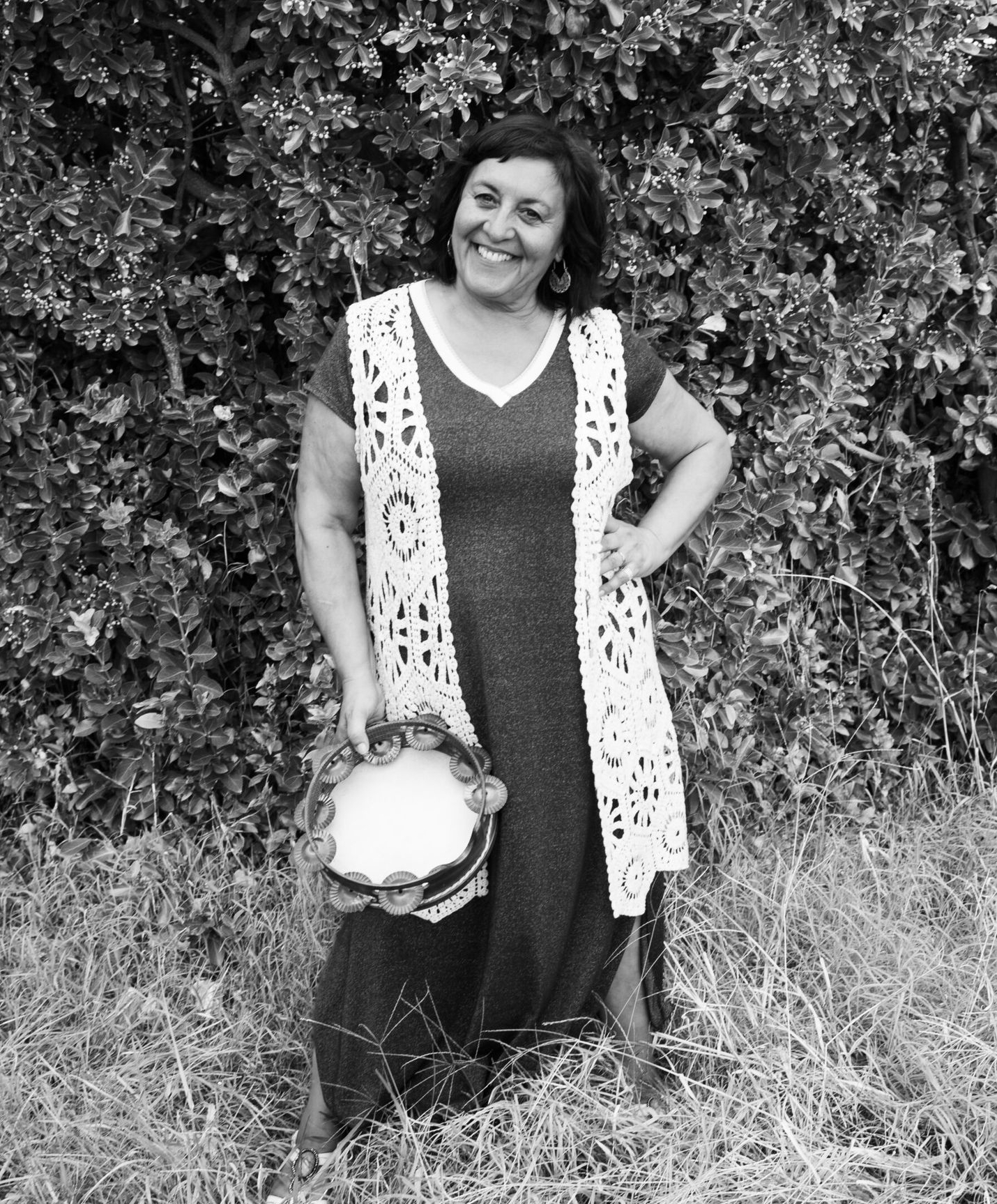

Background information
- Born: Uxía Domínguez Senlle; November 19, 1962 (age 63); Sanguiñeda, Mos, Galicia, Spain
- Genres: Galician Folk

Uxía (born November 19, 1962, in Sanguiñeda, Mos) is a musician from Galicia, Spain. Her songs are based on traditional music, reinterpreted with a renewed and personal treatment. Among other projects, she is the artistic director and an alumna of the International Lusophone Festival, Cantos na Maré.

== Discography ==
=== Albums ===
- Foliada de marzo (Edigal), 1986
- A estrela de maio (Edigal), 1987, with Na Lúa
- Ondas do mar de Vigo (GASA), 1989, with Na Lúa
- Entre cidades (Sons Galiza), 1991
- Estou vivindo no ceo (Nubenegra), 1995
- La sal de la vida (Nubenegra), 1997, with Rasha, María Salgado and Xesús Pimentel
- Danza das areas, (Virgin), 2000
- Cantos na maré (Nordesía), 2005, with Chico César, Filipa Pais, Manecas Costa, Astra Harris, Xabier Díaz and Jon Luz
- Eterno navegar (Harmonía Mundi. World Village), 2008
- Meu canto (Fol Música), 2011
- Andando a terra (Fundación Manuel María), 2012, about poems of Manuel María
- Rosalía pequeniña (Galaxia/Sonárbore), 2013
- Baladas da Galiza imaxinaria (Edicións Damadriña), 2015, with Fran Pérez (Narf)
- Canta o cuco, Editorial Galaxia, 2015, with Magín Blanco
- Uxía canta a Manuel María, Fundación Manuel María, 2015
- UXIA-O, Fundación Uxío Novoneyra, 2017

=== Collaborations ===
- Lo bueno, dentro (1995) by Víctor Coyote
- Emilio Rúa (2000) by Emilio Rúa
- Alma de buxo (2001) by Susana Seivane
- Que o pano non-me namora (2002) by Malvela
- Komunikando (2003) by Diplomáticos de Montealto
- Aghinaldo (2004) by Malvela
- Vida miña (2006) by Emilio Rúa
- Da miña xanela á túa (2007) by Malvela
- Na flor dos meus anos (2007) by Señora Carmen
- Acácia (2007) by Mingo Rangel
- O coraçao tem três portas (2007) by Dulce Pontes
- Etxea (2008) by Kepa Junquera
- Alalá do Cebreiro (2009) by Brañas Folk
- Terra de soños (2009) by Fuxan os Ventos
- Interior (2010) by Emilio Rúa
- Cores do Atlântico (2010), by Socorro Lira

=== Compilations albums ===
- A Cantar con Xabarín Vol. III (CRTVG, 1996)
- All Children in School, All Cultures Together (Fundación Audrey Hepburn, 1997) with Omara Portoundo, Susana Baca, Teresa Salgueiro, Caetano Veloso and Dulce Pontes
- Cantigas de Nadal (Boa, 1998) with Berrogüetto, A Quenlla, Xistra De Coruxo, Os Cempes, Leilía, Maite Dono, Pancho Alvarez, Muxicas, Na Lúa and Chouteira
- Galicia, terra única (Xacobeo, 1999)
- Spain in My Heart: Songs of the Spanish Civil War (Appleseed Records, 2003) with Arlo Guthrie, Michele Greene, John McCutcheo, Guardabarranco, Lila Downs, Aoife Clancy, Joel Rafael & Jamaica Rafael, Elixeo Parra, Quetzal and Laurie Lewis
- Euskadi Galiziarekin/Galicia con Euskadi (Radio Euskadi, 2003)
- Marea de Música (Boa, 2003)
- Hadas (Factoría Author, 2004) with Mercedes Peón, Marina Rossell, Mestisay, María del Mar Bonet, Ginesa Ortega and Faltriqueira
- Meniños cantores (Pontenasondas, Pai música and Casa de Tolos, 2006)
- A Terra do Zeca: Tributo a Jose Afonso (Som Livre, 2007), with Terra d'Agua + Dulce Pontes, Filipa Pais, Lúcia Moniz and Maria Anadon
- La tierra del agua (Limón Records, 2007) with Leilía, Budiño, Niño Josele and Hip Hop Roots
- España (Putumayo World Music, 2009) with Peret, Gertrudis, DePedro, Burguitos, Calima, Gossos, El Combolinga, Xabier Lete, Gecko Turner, Biella Nuei
- Compositoras (Vol. I) (Tratore, 2010) com Cristina Saraiva, Etel Frota, Simone Guimarães and Socorro Lira
- Cantigas do Camiño (Boa, 2010)
- CoraSons (Kalandraka, 2012)
