= Ortigueira's Festival of Celtic World =

Coordinates: 43°40′59″N 7°51′00″W

Ortigueira's Festival of Celtic World; Festival Internacional do Mundo Celta de Ortigueira
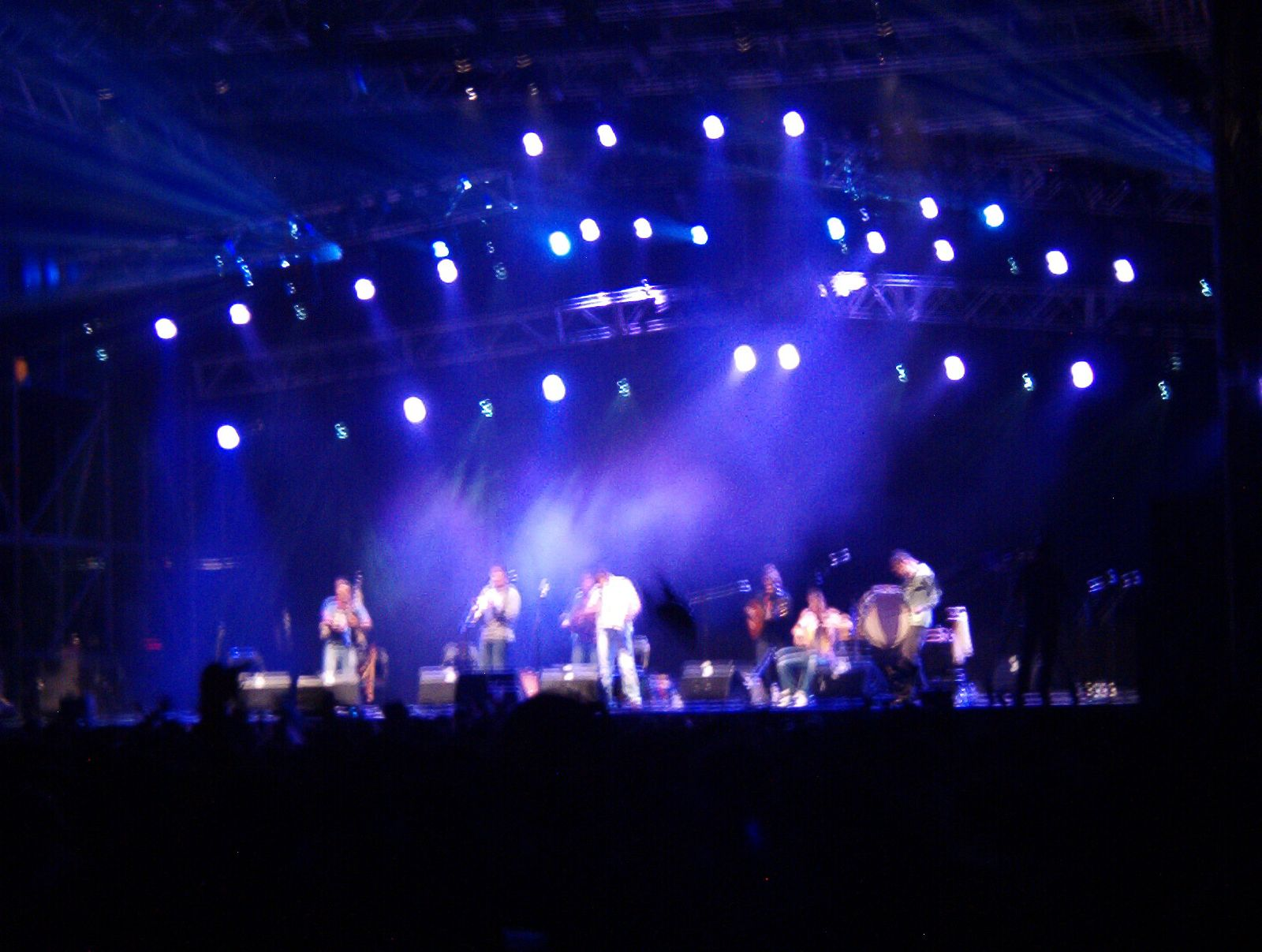
- A concert at Ortigueira's Festival of Celtic World 2006
- Genre: Galician traditional music, Folk
- Dates: July
- Location: Ortigueira
- Years active: 1978–1987 and 1995 onwards
- Founders: Escola de Gaitas de Ortigueira
- Website: festivaldeortigueira.com

Ortigueira, a seaport and borough in County Ferrolterra (A Coruña) in Galicia, celebrates its patron saint day -Saint Martha of Ortigueira's Day- on 29 July.

Held during Saint Martha's day, Ortigueira's Festival of Celtic World (Festival Internacional do Mundo Celta de Ortigueira) is the highlight of the borough's summertime festival calendar. The festival lasts for four days, Thursday to Sunday, and is free.

The main stage is located in the port, and it has hosted performances by Celtic music groups of great level and international fame, such as Alan Stivell or The Chieftains, among many others. Since the 2000 edition in the surroundings of the port rises a smaller stage, the Runas stage, where a jury competition is held between new groups. The prize to the winner is the performance in the main stage in the edition of the following year. Free campsites are available on the beach of Morouzos and in the pine grove for people who go to the festival.

It is considered a Fiesta of International Tourist Interest and is one of the largest folk festivals in terms of number of attendees from all over Europe, having occasionally surpassed 100,000 attendees per edition.

== History ==
The inaugural festival was organized on 30 July 1978 by the Escola de Gaitas de Ortigueira. It was held from 1978 to 1987 and has been held since 1995.

== Groups participating in the festival of Ortigueira ==
2017: Noreia (Slovenia), Gabriel G Diges (Ireland), Koji Koji Moheji (Japan), Skerryvore (Scotland), Crebisnky (Galicia), Bagad Kevren Brest Sant Mark, Escola de Gaitas de Ortigueira, Usher's Island, Scott Wood Band, Böj, The California and District Pipe Band, Oscar Ibañez & Tribo, Michael McGoldrick Band, Tejedor, Harmonica Creams, Gamelas e Anduriñas, Os Carecos e Amigos, Treixadura e Cantigas e Agarimos and A Roda.

2018: Brumafolk (Cantabria), The Taverners (Castela e León), Beltaine (Poland), Ímar (Scotland/Wales), Escola De Gaitas De Ortigueira (Galicia), The National Youth Pipe Band of Scotland (Scotland), Kila (Ireland), Rubén Alba (Asturias), Os D’abaixo (Galicia), Milladoiro (Galicia), Yves Lambert Project (Canada), Gabriel G Diges (Ireland), Airiños De Fene (Galicia), Lúnasa (Ireland), The Celtic Social Club (Brittany).

== See also ==
- Galician traditional music
