= Llan de Cubel =

Llan de Cubel are a Celtic folk band from Asturias (Spain) which specializes in researching, playing and recording Asturian folk music.

Formed in 1984, group has been part of an overall revival and revitalization of Asturian traditional music. The band is a frequent participant in Celtic music festivals, both inside and outside of Asturias, such as the Festival Interceltique de Lorient. True to their effort to play authentic Asturian music, Llan de Cubel play traditional Asturian instruments, such as bagpipes (called gaita), and percussion, in addition to fiddles, accordions, bouzouki, flutes and guitars. The band plays traditional Asturian tunes collected through ethnomusicological research. They also write original material in the tradition of folk music of the region.

Llan de Cubel have won several awards for their music.

== Members ==
Current

- Fonsu Mielgo
- Xel Pereda
- Simon Bradley
- Xuan Rodríguez
- Borja Baragaño
- Julio Rodríguez

Former

- Elías García
- Marcos Llope
- Susi Bello
- Daniel Lombas
- Guzmán Marqués
- Flavio Rodríguez
- J.M.Cano

== Discography ==
- ARPA CÉLTICA (compilation) (1985)
- DEVA (1987)
- NA LLENDE (1990)
- L'OTRU LLAU DE LA MAR (1992)
- IV (1995)
- FESTIVAL INTERCELTIQUE DE LORIENT 25 ans (compilation) (1995)
- NACIONES CELTAS -BUSCANDO EL NORTE (compilation) (1997)
- UN TIEMPU MEYOR (1999)
- LA LLUZ ENCESA (2019)
