= Associação Gaita-de-fole =

Portuguese bagpipe society

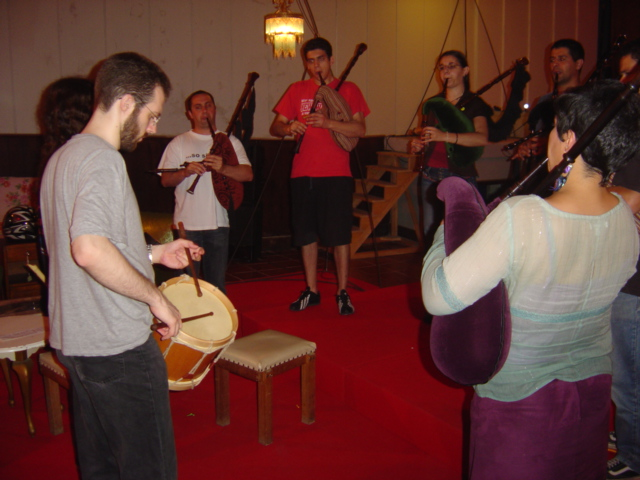
Class of the Bagpipe Association (Portugal)

The Associação Gaita-de-fole (Bagpipe Society) is a non-profit organization, founded officially in 1994 by enthusiasts of the Portuguese folk traditions — especially the related with the Transmontan and Galician bagpipes. The volunteers contribute in a variety of ways, as artisans, musicians, anthropologists and teachers, both professional and amateurs.

== Activities ==
The Associação is centred in Lisbon, and works to preserve the tradition of the Transmontan bagpipe, an instrument of the northern Portuguese region of Trás-os-Montes, which was at serious risk of extinction by the end of the 1980s. To revive the tradition, the association crafts new instruments, offers classes, and researches its history. The research has yielded a rich collection of interviews, images, and music from the last generation of traditional players, some of whom have since died. This has become an invaluable resource.

The courses at the Escola de Gaitas (Bagpipe School) are divided into three levels. The Transmontan bagpipe is generally reserved for the advanced levels. Beginners start with the Galician bagpipe. As a non-profit institution, the school lacks its own facilities, and the classes are offered in various spaces, including the Alentejan Center of Lisbon. Students may rent an instrument, or buy one from the group's workshop.

The workshop crafts different types of bagpipes, as well as their accessories, such as reeds, and uses a variety of woods as raw material. The quality of the instruments is wonderful, as the workshop is vital to the Associação in spreading bagpipe lore. Besides making the instrument available to a growing number of students, the workshop shares craft techniques with other artisans, guaranteeing the preservation of the Transmontan bagpipe.

The Associação also supports the spread of important national events related to Portuguese traditions, participating directly or indirectly. Among them, there are:Andanças, Festa Trad, Encontro Regional de Gaiteiros da Pena, Tocar de Ouvido, Por Tierras de L' Rei and the L' Burro i L' Gueiteiro. The most important of them, the Encontro Nacional de Gaiteiros (National Meeting of Bagpipers) gathered more than 8,000 people in its four years, and has been covered by the main Portuguese newspapers and TV channels, like RTP and SIC.

=== Gaitafolia ===
Gaitafolia is a musical group formed by members of the AGF, among teachers and students, playing bagpipes and other traditional instruments crafted exclusively at its workshop. Their premiere was during Expo98, along with the famous Gaiteiros de Lisboa, and since then they have performed presentations and concerts with other renowned bands, such as Galandum Galundaina, Mandrágora and Dazkarieh. The repertoire varies from traditional tunes to modern ones. The group has been covered by French and Spanish media, and may be the best advertisement for the AGF.

== Recognition ==
Through its work, the Associação Gaita-de-fole has received support for its project to promote the Transmontan bagpipe from the Arts Institute, the Bagpipe Society, Lelia Doura Association, the Pédexumbo and the At-Tambur.

As recognition for the relevance of its projects, the Portuguese Ministry of Culture has provided financial support for many of the activities of the AGF since 2001. Many events, classes, workshops and other projects have been covered by the media, in newspapers such as Expresso, Público and Diário de Notícias.

The Associação has around 200 subscribed members, and many other non-members as supporters.

== See also ==
- Bagpipes
- Types of bagpipes
