= Vassil Bebelekov =

Vassil Bebelekov (Bulgarian: Васил Бебелеков) was a well-known Bulgarian bagpipe player (gaidar), who after a professional career in Bulgaria emigrated to the United States and became one of the most influential performers and teachers of his specialty for Americans.

== Biography ==
Born in the town of Devin in the Rhodope Mountains, he was inspired by his grandfather who played kaba gajda. During the communist era (1944–1989), the Bulgarian government promoted formal training of folk musicians to transcend their regions of origin, and to achieve the highest levels of virtuosity on a par with Western classical performers. Vassil is part of the "2nd generation" of these professionalized folk musicians. Atypically, Vassil specialized in both the kaba gajda (a large bagpipe unique to the Rhodope region) and the smaller džura gajda played elsewhere in Bulgaria and particularly in folk-instrument ("bitov") ensembles.

Vassil played with Ensemble Trakiya and the Philipopolis Ensemble and has recorded for Radio Sofia. He taught for many years at the National Music Folklore School in Shiroka Luka. Later he and his wife, Maria Bebelekova (herself a performer and teacher of Rhodope singing) and their children emigrated to the United States, where they became naturalized citizens. They lived in San Jose, California.

Vassil died while teaching at Lark Camp in Mendocino, CA on July 31, 2016. He left behind many teachings and students to carry on his traditions and innovations.

== Discography ==
Title	Performers	Year	References & reviews	Listen
Horoto e Vechno - The Dance is Eternal	Vasil Bebelekov, Donka Koleva, Nikolay Kolev, Dragi Dragnev	2014	Kef Times Folklore Discography	
From Generation to Generation	Vasil Bebelekov, Petur Iliev	2009	Folklore Discography	
Grupa Maistori	Vasil Bebelekov, Georgi Petrov, Nedyalko Nedyalkov, Angel Dimitrov, Ivaylo Koutehev	2003	Folklore Discography Erik's Music Database	
Made in Bulgaria - 95% Dance Music	Maria Bebelekova, Vassil Bebelekov, Jordan Iliev, Dimitar Bojadziev, Enel Vitanov	1999	Folklore Discography	
New Renaissance In Bulgarian Folk Music	Various	1996	Folklore Discography	
Shiroka Lukka Sings	Various	1983	Discogs Folklore Discography	
Vasil Bebelekov Presents	Vassil Bebelekov, Petur Iliev		Erik's Music Database Folklore Discography	
