= Avelino Cachafeiro =

Avelino Cachafeiro Bugallo, called O Gaiteiro de Soutelo (May 26, 1899 – April 13, 1972) was a Galician musician who played the gaita, the traditional Galician bagpipe. Cachafeiro also wrote poetry, painted, and owned businesses. In 1969, he published Voando coas aas da vida ("Flying with the Wings of Life"), a book of poetry.

== Background ==
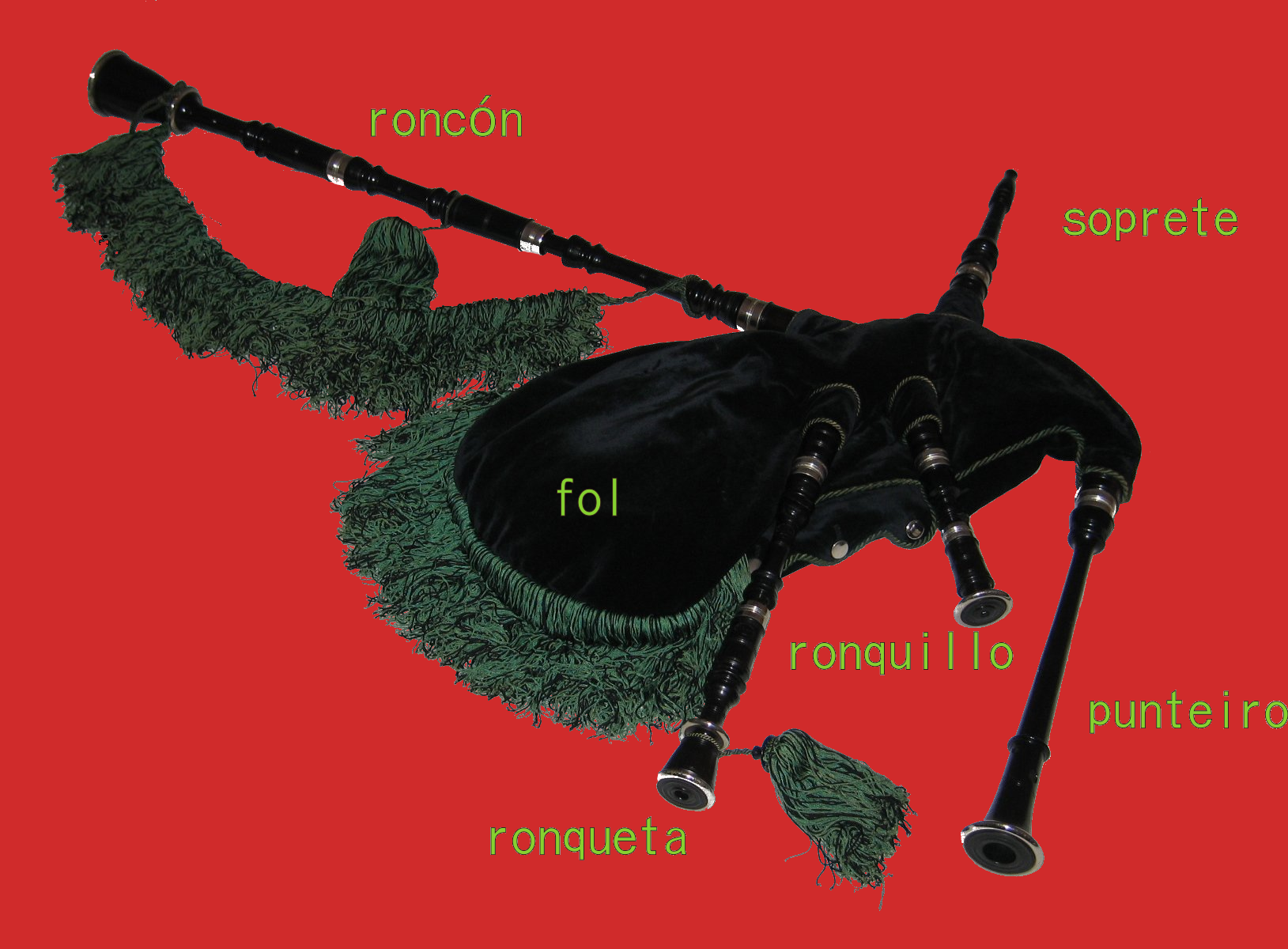
Galician gaita

Cachafeiro was born in Soutelo de Montes in Galicia, Spain, into a family of musicians from Terra de Montes, and he learned to play the bagpipes with his grandfather Xan. His father, named Fermín, gave him his own bagpipes. He created the bagpipes group Os Gaiteiros de Soutelo, along with his brothers Castor (bagpipe) and Bautista (voice), his father Fermín (bass-drum) and his aunt Andrea, who sometimes played with them on the pandeiro.

When he was 25 years old, he was proclaimed the best gaita player of Galicia in a contest at Santiago de Compostela in 1924. In 1928, the group recorded "Muiñeira de Chantada", "Alborada de Rosalía", "muiñeira de Pontesampaio", "Fandango de Pontevedra", "Marcha do Corpus", "Viva Barriño de Arén", "Heicho de dar queridiña", "Foliada de Luxán", "Foliada Rianxeira", "Estróupele-Estróupele", "Farruquiña chaman á porta", "Muiñeira de Ourense" and "A volta da festa".

Along with his brothers Castor and Bautista, Os Gaiteiros de Soutelo travelled through Galicia, Buenos Aires, Montevideo, Brazil and Barcelona, until the beginning of the Spanish Civil War, when they were playing in Barcelona, in the Republican territory, while Galicia remained under the control of the insurgents. The Cultural Obreira carried them to Madrid, to encourage the troops. After that, when they were traveling to Berlin to play in the Olympic Games, they decided to return home. That was the last performance of the group. Avelino never played publicly again. He wrote poetry, painted, and engaged in businesses (he had a gas station and a night club). In 1969, he published the poetry book Voando coas aas da vida ("Flying with the Wings of Life").
