= Anxo Lorenzo =

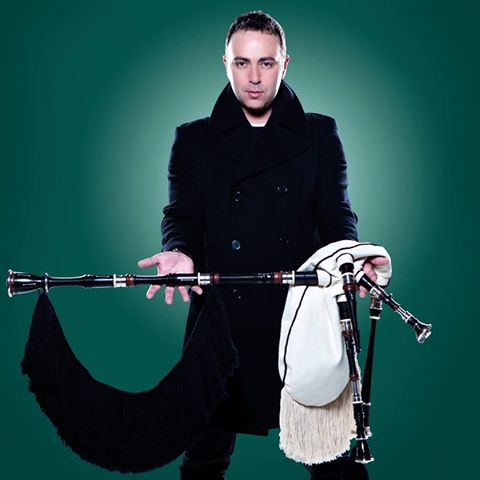
- Anxo Lorenzo

Background information
- Born: Anxo Lorenzo; December 28, 1974 (age 51); Moaña, Pontevedra,, Galicia, Spain
- Genres: Celtic music, folk, rock, alternative, pop, chill-out, Hindu music
- Occupations: Musician and multi-instrumentalist
- Instruments: Galician bagpipe, gaita, piano Flauta Barroca
- Years active: 1979–present

Anxo Lorenzo is a musician who plays the gaita, the traditional Galician bagpipe, from Moaña (Tirán), a small village on the Atlantic Coast of Galicia (Spain).

Lorenzo has played at several festivals, including Piping Live!, the 2019 Newcastle Piping Festival (UK), the William Kennedy Piping Festival and Féile Iorrais in Northern Ireland .

== Discography ==
- 2001: Spíritu (986)
- 2010: Tirán
