= Fred Morrison =

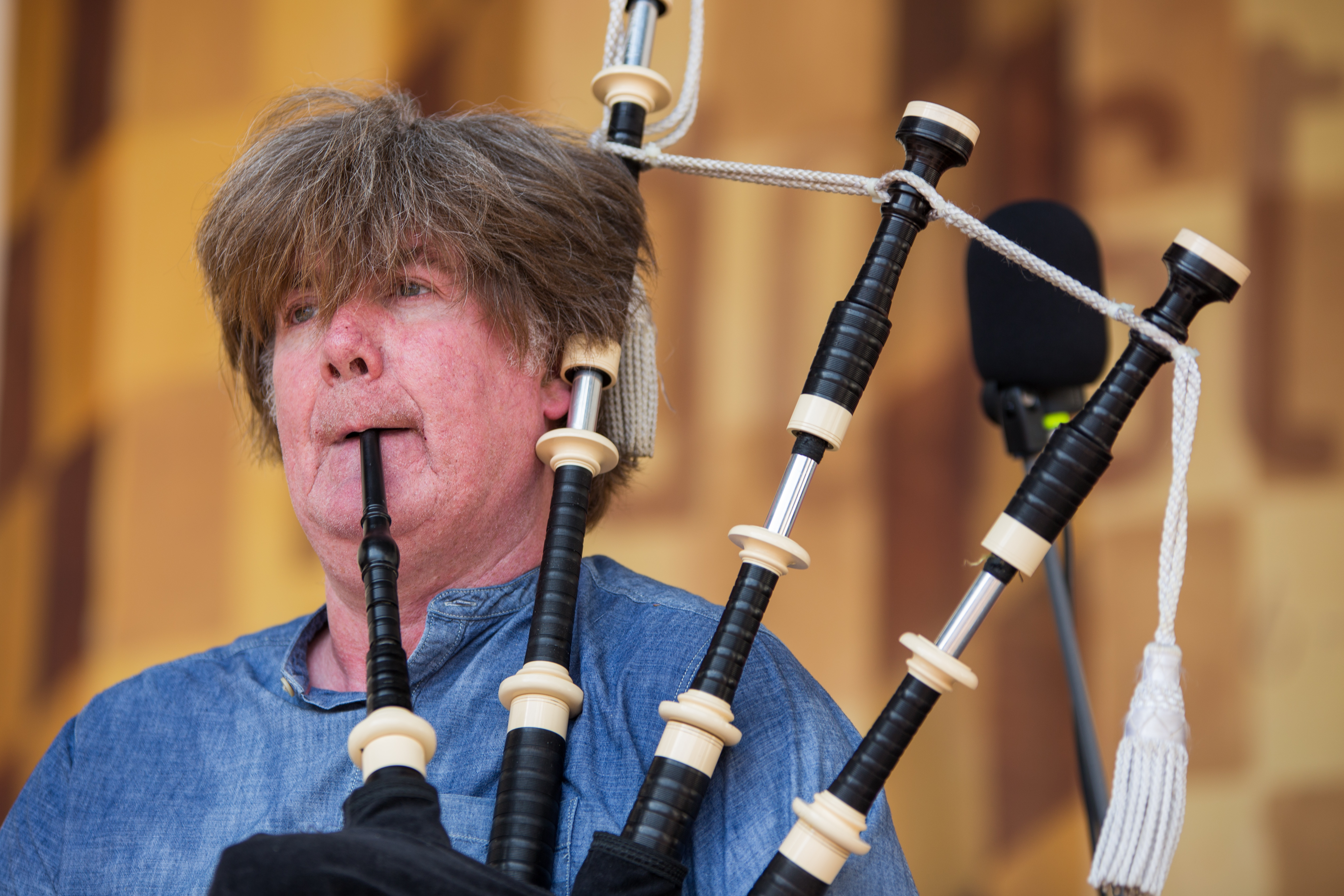
- Fred Morrison at Rudolstadt-Festival, Germany 2017

Background information
- Born: 1963 (age 61–62)
- Instrument: Bagpipes
- Website: fredmorrison.com

Fred Morrison (born 1963 in Bishopton, Renfrewshire) is a Scottish musician and composer. He has performed professionally on the Great Highland Bagpipes, Scottish smallpipes, Border pipes, low whistle, Northumbrian Smallpipes and uilleann pipes.

He holds the record for the most Macallan/MacCrimmon Trophies at the Lorient festival, having received the trophy ten times. As well as his work as a solo piper, he has played with such bands as Clan Alba and Capercaillie. His albums have been met with critical acclaim.

In 2004 he was voted Instrumentalist of the Year in the Scots Trad Music awards. He has won a number of prizes in the solo Highland Bagpipes circuit.

Morrison's tunes have become popular in the solo piping circuit and the folk scene. Notable are "Passing Places", respectively a lively hornpipe and a low whistle slow air inspired by train rides that Morrison made all over the UK, "Living Uist", "The Lochaber Badger" and the strathspey "Seonaidh's Tune" that he composed for his son.

Morrison is also the founder and designer of Fred Morrison Pipes, a brand producing Highland bagpipes, Border pipes and Scottish small pipes.

== Discography ==
Solo albums

- The Broken Chanter (1993)
- The Sound of the Sun (2000)
- Outlands (2009)

Fred Morrison and Jamie McMenemy

- Up South (2003)

Fred Morrison Trio

- Live at the Glasgow Royal Concert Hall (2015)

Various artists including Fred Morrison

- Celtic Colours (1998)
- Piping Up (2000)
