= Carlos Núñez =

Carlos Núñez may refer to:

- Carlos Núñez Cortés (born 1942), Argentine humorist, pianist, composer and chemist
- Carlos Núñez Muñoz (born 1971), Galician musician
- Carlos Núñez Téllez, Nicaraguan politician
- Carlos Núñez (footballer) (born 1992), Uruguayan footballer

== See also ==
- Carlos Nunes (born 1914), former Portuguese footballer
- Juan Carlos Núñez (born 1983), Mexican footballer
