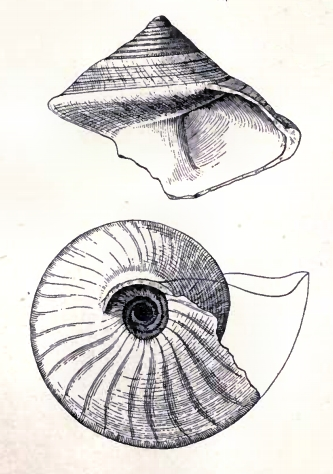
- Original drawing with two views of a shell of Calliostoma brunneum

Scientific classification
- Kingdom: Animalia
- Phylum: Mollusca
- Class: Gastropoda
- Subclass: Vetigastropoda
- Order: Trochida
- Family: Calliostomatidae
- Genus: Calliostoma
- Species: C. brunneum

Binomial name
- Calliostoma brunneum (Dall, 1881)

Synonyms
- Calliostoma (Astele) tejedori Aguayo, C.G., 1949; Fluxina brunnea Dall, 1881 (original description)

= Calliostoma brunneum =

Species of gastropod

Calliostoma brunneum, is commonly known asTejedor top shell. It is a species of sea snail, a marine gastropod mollusk in the family Calliostomatidae.

== Description ==
The maximum recorded shell length is 32 mm. The large, solid shell is depressed. It contains five to seven whorls.

It is light brown with a few touches of white transverse to the whorls on the carina, the umbilical rib is white. The nucleus and interior walls of the umbilicus is dark brown; while several of the spiral grooves above and below are marked by a darker brown than the rest, and appear as brown lines.

(Original description by W.H. Dall) The sculpture above, on the nuclear whorls, consists of close-set sharp longitudinal grooves with the ridges between them rounded and more or less beaded or nodulous. They are crossed by more or less evident lines of growth, which, however, are not necessarily coincident with the beading where present. The grooves continue, but do not seem to increase in number, while all sculpture disappears from between them. The interspaces are smooth and flat and only marked by very light lines of growth. The carina is separated from the rest of the whorl by a squarish shallow gutter, somewhat too broad to be termed a groove. The base of the shell rounds up over the periphery so that the most angular edge of the carina is at the top . The base between is flat and rounded, marked by evanescent (partly brown) grooves and transversely by delicate flexuous slightly raised aggregations of the lines of growth at somewhat regular intervals. These slightly crenate the umbilical rib on its inner edge and perhaps form the pronounced, slightly backwardly flexed, striae and ridges which mark the umbilical walls. There is hardly any callus on the body wall at the aperture, which is broken in the specimens at hand. Its form has been made out from the lines of growth. The suture in the later whorls is closely appressed, the carinal gutter would at first sight be taken for it. The first two and a half whorls are solidly filled with translucent shelly matter.

== Distribution ==
This species occurs in the Gulf of Mexico, the Caribbean Sea and the Lesser Antilles.

== Habitat ==
Minimum recorded depth is 23 m. Maximum recorded depth is 1767 m.
