= Rasha (singer) =

Sudanese musical artist and actress

- Also known as: Rasha
- Born: Rasha Sheikh Eldin; 1971 (age 54–55); Omdurman, Sudan
- Origin: Sudan
- Genres: Sudanese music, World Music
- Occupations: Singer, actress
- Years active: 1994–present
- Labels: Intuition Records, Nubenegra

Rasha Sheikh Eldin, better known mononymously as Rasha (born 1971) is a Sudanese musical artist and actress, known both for her music as well as for her appearance in the movies The Sheik and I (2012) and Lush (1999).

== Biography ==
Born in 1971, in Omdurman, Sudan, Rasha's singing in her native Sudanese Arabic combines the musical traditions of Sudan and South Sudan. In the arrangements of her songs, she has also embraced, among other musical styles, Afro-pop, flamenco or reggae. In 1991, she moved to Spain, and released her debut album, Sundaniyat, in 1997. In 2000, her second album, Let Me Be, including songs in Spanish or English, was released. That same year, one of her songs was featured in the compilation La Sal de la Vida (The Salt of the Earth) with María Salgado, Uxía, and Xesús Pimentel.

In 2017, Rasha was a performing artist at The Mayor of London's Eid Festival on Trafalgar Square. That same year, she was a guest at Shubbak, an annual event at the British Library for Arab-speaking artists that celebrates contemporary Arab culture.

Rasha comes from a large family, which includes intellectuals, artists, and musicians. Her brother Wafir, for example, played with the Spanish world music band Radio Tarifa.

Rasha's song "Ojos de gacela" ("Eyes of Gazelle") was nominated as Best Original Song at the 2003 Spanish Goya Awards.

== Discography ==
- Sundaniyat (1997)
- Let Me Be (2000)
