= Carlos Tejedor =

Carlos Tejedor may refer to:

- Carlos Tejedor (politician) (1817–1903), governor of Buenos Aires, 1878–1880
- Carlos Tejedor Partido, an administrative district in Buenos Aires Province, Argentina
- Carlos Tejedor, Buenos Aires, a city in Buenos Aires Province, Argentina
