= Olle Gällmo =

Swedish musician (born 1966)

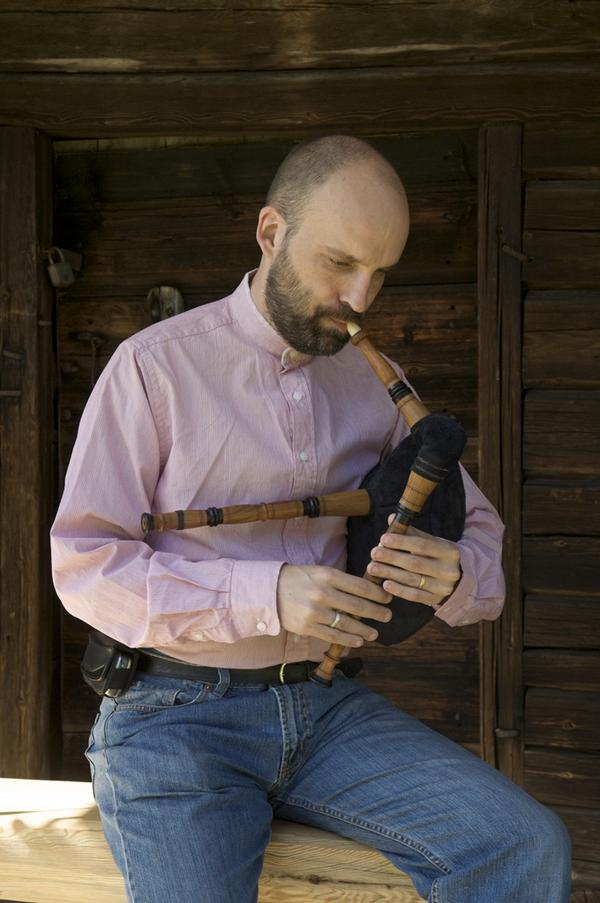

Olle Gällmo (born 26 June 1966) is a Swedish musician and riksspelman, known for his work in playing and promoting the säckpipa, or traditional Swedish bagpipe.

== Musical activities ==
In 1991 Gällmo began researching the Swedish säckpipa (native bagpipe) tradition, and has since become one of the instrument's most vocal proponents in Sweden and abroad, through concerts, courses, workshops, lectures, and a comprehensive website covering the instrument.

Gällmo plays both the traditional mouthblown single-drone säckpipa, as well as a modernised variant featuring bellows and multiple drones. The latter instrument is more flexible, allowing him to play his pipes in wider contexts, and to sing along with his own accompaniment. Gällmo also plays medieval and Renaissance music.

== Academic career ==
Gällmo is licentiate and lecturer in computer science, particularly artificial intelligence, at Uppsala University.

== Discography ==
- Double Yolks, Duo Gällmo Branschke (2019)
- Olle Gällmo - med pipan i säcken (2008)

== Bibliography ==
- An Introduction to Neurocomputer Design (1991)

== Awards ==
- Silver Zorn Medal - riksspelman 2008

== Groups ==
- Celsiustrion
- Härfågel
- Joculatores Upsalienses
- Zenner&Greiner
