= Tejedor (band) =

Tejedor is a folk music group from Avilés, Asturias, Spain, consisting originally of three siblings (Jose, Javier and Eva Tejedor). Eva left the band in 2010, being replaced by Silvia Quesada on vocals. Tejedor's members play traditional Asturian styles of music using traditional instruments such as bagpipes, flutes, accordions and guitars.

Tejedor has become known on the international Celtic music scene, the two brothers of the group winning on several occasions the McCallan bagpipe awards at the Inter Celtic Music Festival in Lorient, France.

Their first album, Texedores De Suaños, was produced by Phil Cunningham and features musicians like Michael McGoldrick, Duncan Chisholm, James McKintosh and Kepa Junkera.

== Discography ==
- Texedores de Suaños (1999)
- Llunáticos (Aris Música/Resistencia, 2003)
- Música Na Maleta (2007)
- Positivu (2011)

The discography comes from "World Music Central" (see below).
