= Fuxan os Ventos =

Galician folk music group

Fuxan Os Ventos
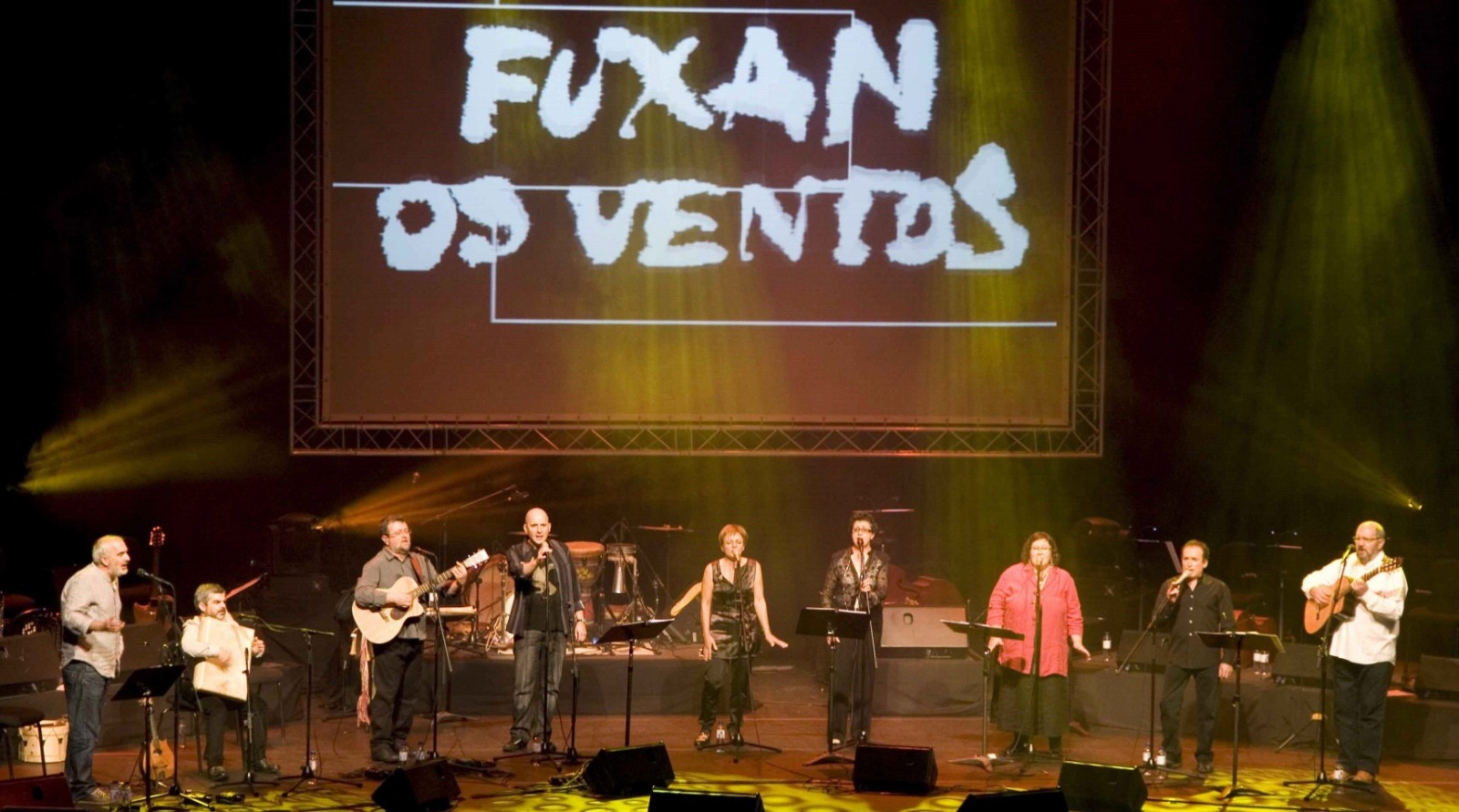
- Fuxan os Ventos in 2008

Background information
- Origin: Lugo, Galicia, Spain
- Genres: Galician folk music
- Years active: 1972–present
- Website: fuxanosventos.gal

Fuxan os Ventos is a modern Galician folk music group, founded in 1972 in Lugo, Galicia. They sing in Galician, the language of Galicia.

== Discography ==
=== Studio albums ===
- Fuxan Os Ventos (1976)
- O Tequeletequele (1977)
- Galicia Canta Ó Neno (1978)
- Sementeira (1978)
- Quen A Soubera Cantar (1981)
- Noutrora (1984)
- Sempre E Máis Despois (1999)
- Na Memoria Dos Tempos (2002)

=== Singles ===
- Galicia (2016)
- Lúa De Prata (2018)

== See also ==
- Galician traditional music
