= Milladoiro =

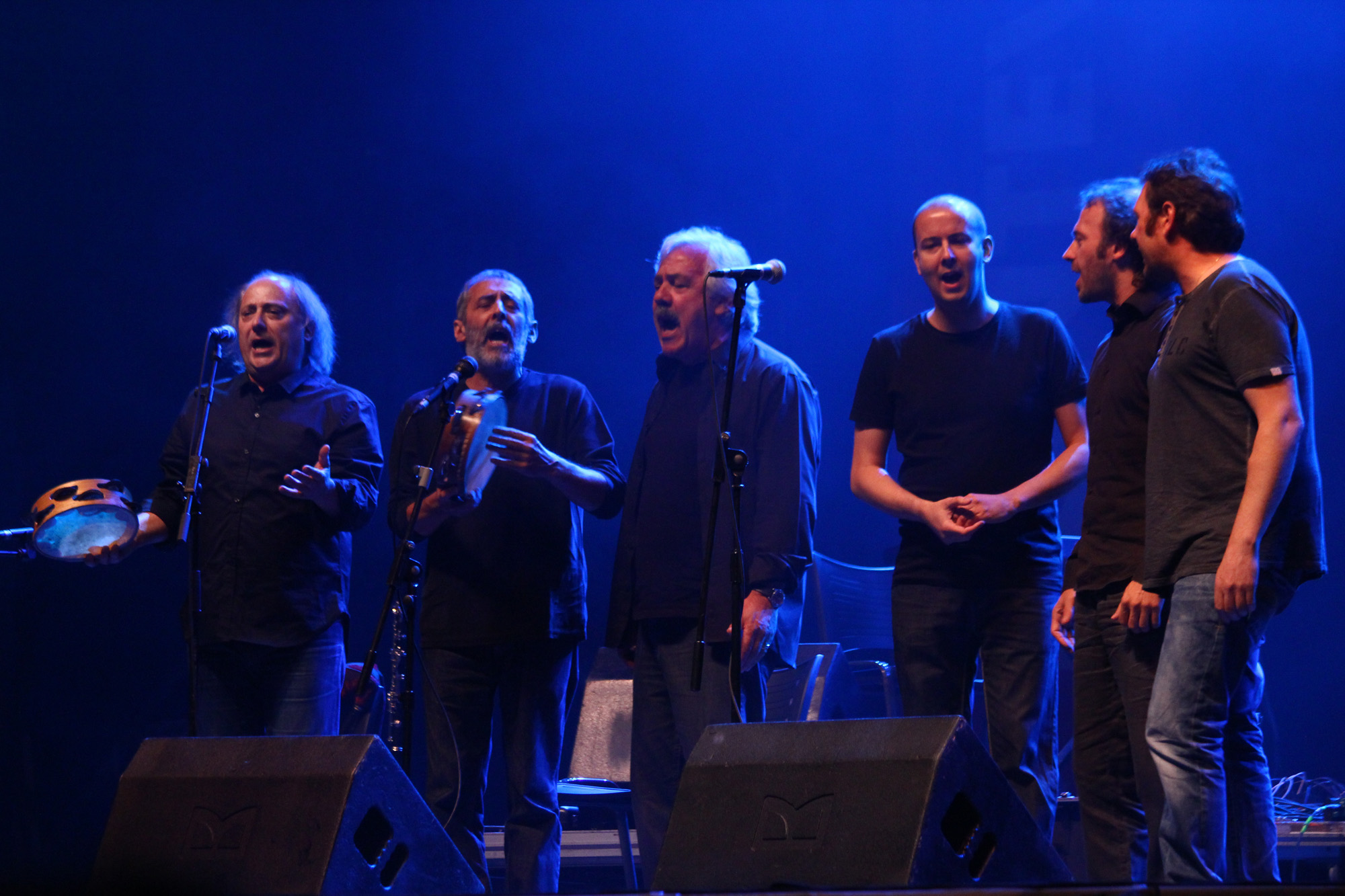
Milladoiro in Pontevedra, 2014

Milladoiro (English: "cairn") is a traditional Celtic-Galician music group that records and performs music with roots in Galicia, Spain. Members of the group have also composed and recorded their own pieces, in the style of Galician music. Often compared to The Chieftains of Ireland—with whom they have shared the stage and recording studio—, Milladoiro is among the world's top Celtic music groups, and is one of the most successful traditional/folk groups to come out of the Iberian Peninsula, as a whole.

== Biography ==
In 1978, Rodrigo Romaní and Antón Seoane released an album named "Milladoiro", on which they were joined by Xosé V. Ferreirós, then credited as a guest artist. The album received a critic's award the same year.

Ferreirós, along with Nando Casal and Moncho García Rei, from his group Faíscas do Xiabre, invited Romaní and Seoane as guests in their next album.

The fusion of the two groups, with the addition of the flautist Xosé A. Méndez and the violinist Laura Quintillán, constituted the foundation of Milladoiro, which swept the Galician musical scene of the 20th century.

To commemorate the 25th anniversary of the band, a compilation album, XXV, was released in 2005.

In 2006, Chris Thile covered their song "O Santo De Polvora" on his album How to Grow a Woman from the Ground.

== Line-up ==
Actual members

- Xosé Ferreirós: bagpipes, mandolin, tin whistle, bouzouki, percussion (since 1978)
- Nando Casal: bagpipes, clarinet, tin whistle, bagpipes (since 1978)
- Moncho García Rei: bodhrán, percussion (since 1978)
- Harry.c : violin (since 1998)
- Manú Conde: guitars, bouzouki (since 2000)
- Manuel Riveiro: keyboards, accordion (since 2013)

== Discography ==
- 1979 A Galicia de Maeloc
- 1980 O Berro Seco
- 1982 Milladoiro 3
- 1984 Solfafria
- 1986 Galicia no país das Maravillas
- 1987 Divinas palabras
- 1989 Castellum Honesti
- 1991 Galicia No Tempo
- 1993 A Via Láctea
- 1993 A Xeometría da Alma
- 1994 Iacobus Magnus
- 1995 Gallaecia Fulget
- 1995 As fadas de estraño nome
- 1999 No confín dos verdes castros
- 1999 Auga de Maio
- 1999 Cabana de Bergantiños
- 2002 O niño do sol
- 2002 Adobrica Suite
- 2005 Milladoiro album
- 2006 Unha estrela por guîa
- 2008 A quinta das lágrimas
- 2016 Milladoiro en Ortigueira (CD+DVD)
- 2018 Atlántico
- 2022 Cantiga(s) de Amigos

== See also ==
- Galician traditional music
