= Muiñeira =

Galician traditional dance and musical genre

The muiñeira (Galician: muiñeira, Castilian and Asturian: muñeira) is a traditional dance and musical genre of Galicia and some parts of Asturias (Spain). It is distinguished mainly by its expressive and lively tempo, played usually in 6/8, although some variants are performed in other time signatures. There are also variant types of muiñeira which remain in the tempo of 6/8 but which displace the accent in different ways. Muiñeira is associated with traditional choreographic schemes and the associated instrumentation is a form of bagpipe known as a gaita. It is subject to highly varied interpretation in differing local traditions. According to "Galicia-The Spanish Cousins", an article on Roots World, muiñeira is the Galician "equivalent" of a jig, which is consistent with the time signature of 6/8. The word "muiñeira" (the same pronunciation in Portuguese, but spelled "moinheira") means literally both millstone and a mill landlady (or the miller's wife, if a man). Galician music is classified as part of Celtic music.

== Characteristics of the muiñeira ==
It is a dance of playful character, with a social component expressing gallantry. It is somewhat more permissive of improvisation than other folk dances; improvised in fiestas and exhibitions. Some interpreters have added increased complexity to its traditional choreography.

It is played at a fast tempo. Dancers often form a circle or parallel threes. Often jumps are incorporated, synchronized with percussion accompaniment: a snare-drum known as the tamboril (a wooden natural-skinned drum with gut snares), and the bombo, a bass drum.

Examples of the genre recommended by native Galician commentators include ' ' Muiñeira de Chantada' ' and to ' ' Muiñeira de Lugo' '.

== Notable performers ==
=== Carlos Núñez ===
According to RootsWorld"the most prominent gaita virtuoso in Galicia, and one of the world's best, is Carlos Núñez. He often tours and records with The Chieftains, who consider him an auxiliary member of the group". Núñez performed a "Muneira de Chantada" with the Chieftains in early 2008, which featured Irish foot dancing. (Note: Roughly translated, it says: like the Druids of Britain we asked to him to God or the Gods that dance of the happiness immersed in that state forever in one eternal celebration, by the pipe of Peace, culture and love.)

=== Susana Seivane ===
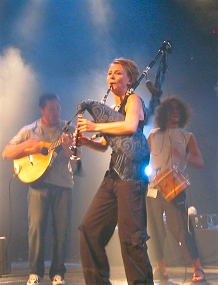
Susana Seivane playing the gaita

Susana Seivane Hoyo (born 25 August 1976) is a Galician gaita (bagpipes) player born in Barcelona, Spain, into a family of well-known Galician luthiers and musicians, the Seivane family, whose workshop is the Obradoiro de Gaitas Seivane. She started her musical career at the age of three. Guided by her father Álvaro Seivane and influenced by skilled bagpipers such as her grandfather Xosé Manuel Seivane, Ricardo Portela and Moxenas, she is notable in the bagpipe world and the world of traditional Galician music. She synthesizes the "enxebre" style of the ancient bagpipers while creating her own style including other musical influences.

== Instrumentation ==
Galician bagpipes come in three main varieties, though there are exceptions and unique instruments. These include the tumbal (B-flat), grileira (D) and redonda (C). Asturian bagpipes are usually played along with a tambor (snare drum). Asturian bagpipes usually have only one drone and follow a different fingering pattern. Tunes using the gaita are usually songs, with the voice either accompanying the instrumentation or taking turns with it.

== See also ==
- Music of Spain
- Celtic music
- Bagpipes

== Additional references ==
- Cronshaw, Andrew. "Celtic Iberia". 2001. In Mathieson, Kenny (Ed.), Celtic music, pp. 140–175. Backbeat Books. ISBN 0-87930-623-8
- Celtic Music Base, large biographical directory of Celtic musicians.
