= Susana Seivane =

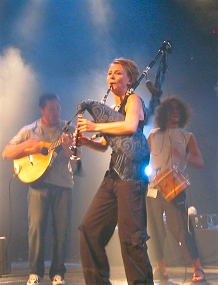

Background information
- Born: Susana Seivane; 1976; Barcelona, Catalonia, Spain
- Instrument: Bagpipes

Susana Seivane Hoyo (born 25 August 1976) is a Galician musician. She was born in Barcelona, Spain, into a family of well-known Galician luthiers and musicians, the Seivane family, whose workshop is the Obradoiro de Gaitas Seivane. She is influenced by skilled bagpipers and is notable in traditional Galician music for synthesizing the style of the ancient bagpipers while creating her own style including other musical influences.

== Festivals ==
From 1999, when Susana Seivane issued her first album, the gaiteira gave many concerts and participated in festivals in Spain, other European countries and the United States, receiving praise from the public and from critics. She goes to many important national and international festivals and travels around the world, having attended the Festival Celtic Connections in Scotland, the Festival Rudolstadt in Germany, the Dranouter Fest in Belgium, the Irish Festival in Italy, the Festival Interceltique de Lorient in Brittany, the Brampton Festival, Eastleigh Summer Music Festival, and Cambridge Folk Festival in England, and the Malahide International Festival of Piping & Drumming in Ireland. In France she has performed in concert in Paris, Nantes, Lyons, Les Irlandays, Juvisy sur Orge, the Festival du Bout du Monde and the Festival de Saint-Loup in Guingamp. In Spain she has played at the Festival Folk de Getxo, the Mercat de la Música Viva de Vic in Barcelona, La Mar de Músicas at Cartagena, the Festival Mendébala de Bizkaia, the Festival Folk de Segovia, San Froilán de Barcelona, Karrantza de Bizkaia, and the Festival Folk de Cantabria. She often appears in Galicia at venues such as the Festival do Mundo Celta de Ortigueira, San Froilán en Lugo, Festas de Maria Pita, Praza Maior de Ourense, Plaza de la Quintana of Santiago de Compostela, and Pontevedra.

== Discography ==
- Susana Seivane (1999)
- Alma de buxo (2001)
- Mares de tempo (2004)
- Os soños que volven (2009)

=== Compilations ===
- Celtic Colours; Vol 4 (2001) (1 song)
- Celtic Women (Keltia)

== Accolades ==
- Finalist in the Indie Awards 2001
- 4th Premio Xarmenta in 2008 for her defense of the Galician language
- Premio Artista of the TVG
- Premio Opinión (twice)
- Star of the year

== See also ==
- Galician traditional music
