= Galician gaita =

Traditional bagpipe of Galicia and northern Portugal

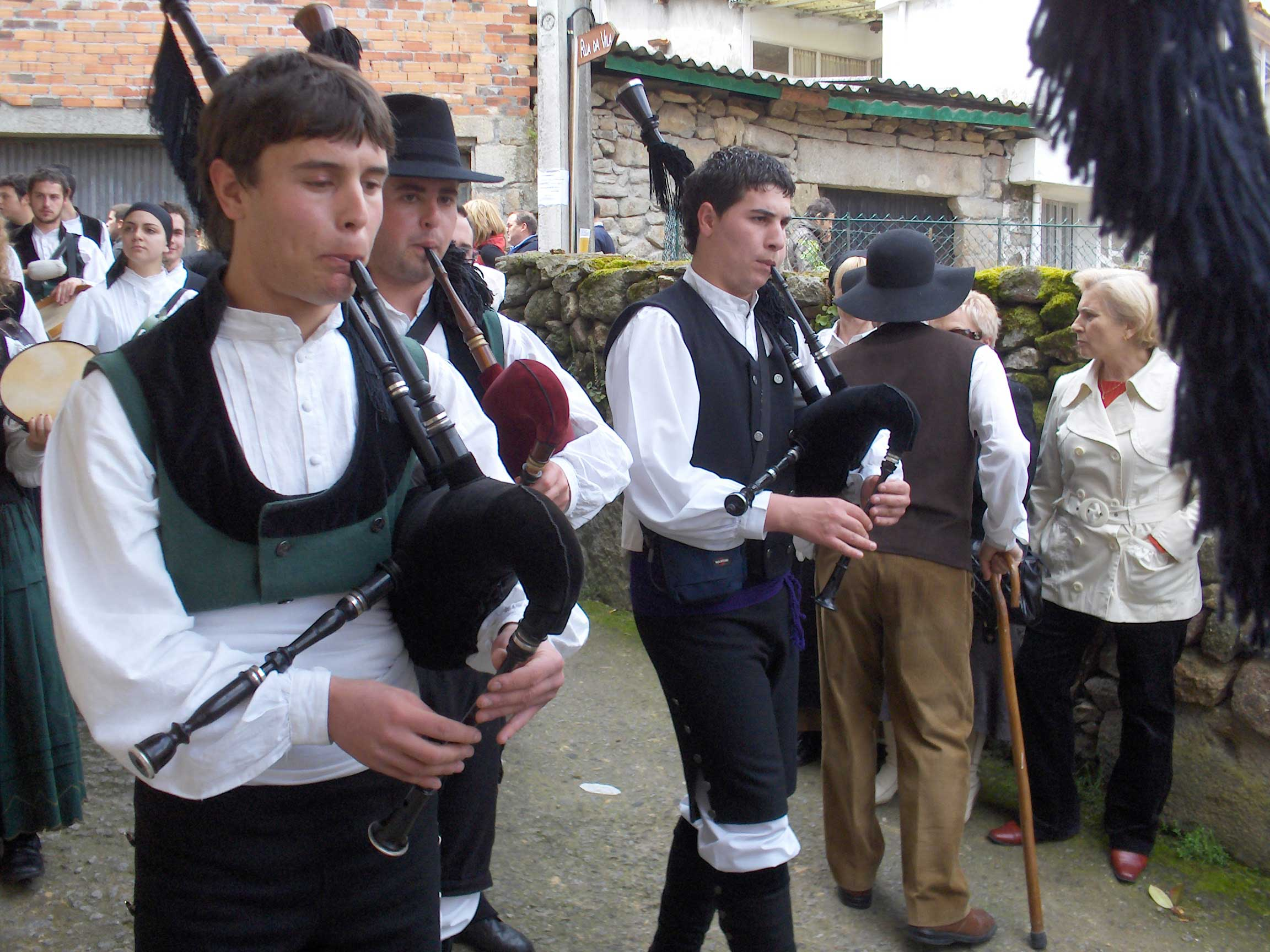
Galician gaiteiros (bagpipers)

The Galician gaita (Galician: Gaita galega, Portuguese: Gaita galega, Spanish: Gaita gallega) is the traditional instrument of Galicia and northern Portugal.

The word gaita is used across northern Spain as a generic term for "bagpipe", although in the south of Spain and Portugal it denotes a variety of horn, flute or oboe like instruments according to region.

== Etymology ==
There are many suggestions as to the origin of the name gaita. It has been compared to the names of eastern European bagpipes, such as the Bulgarian kaba gaida and the Slovak gajdy (plurale tantum). The linguist Joan Coromines has suggested that the word gaita most likely derived from a Gothic word gait or gata, meaning "goat"; as the bag of a gaita is made from a whole, case-skinned goat hide. Gothic was spoken in Hispania from the fifth century to the eighth century when the country was ruled by the Visigoths. The Visigoths originated in north-eastern Europe.

== The instrument ==
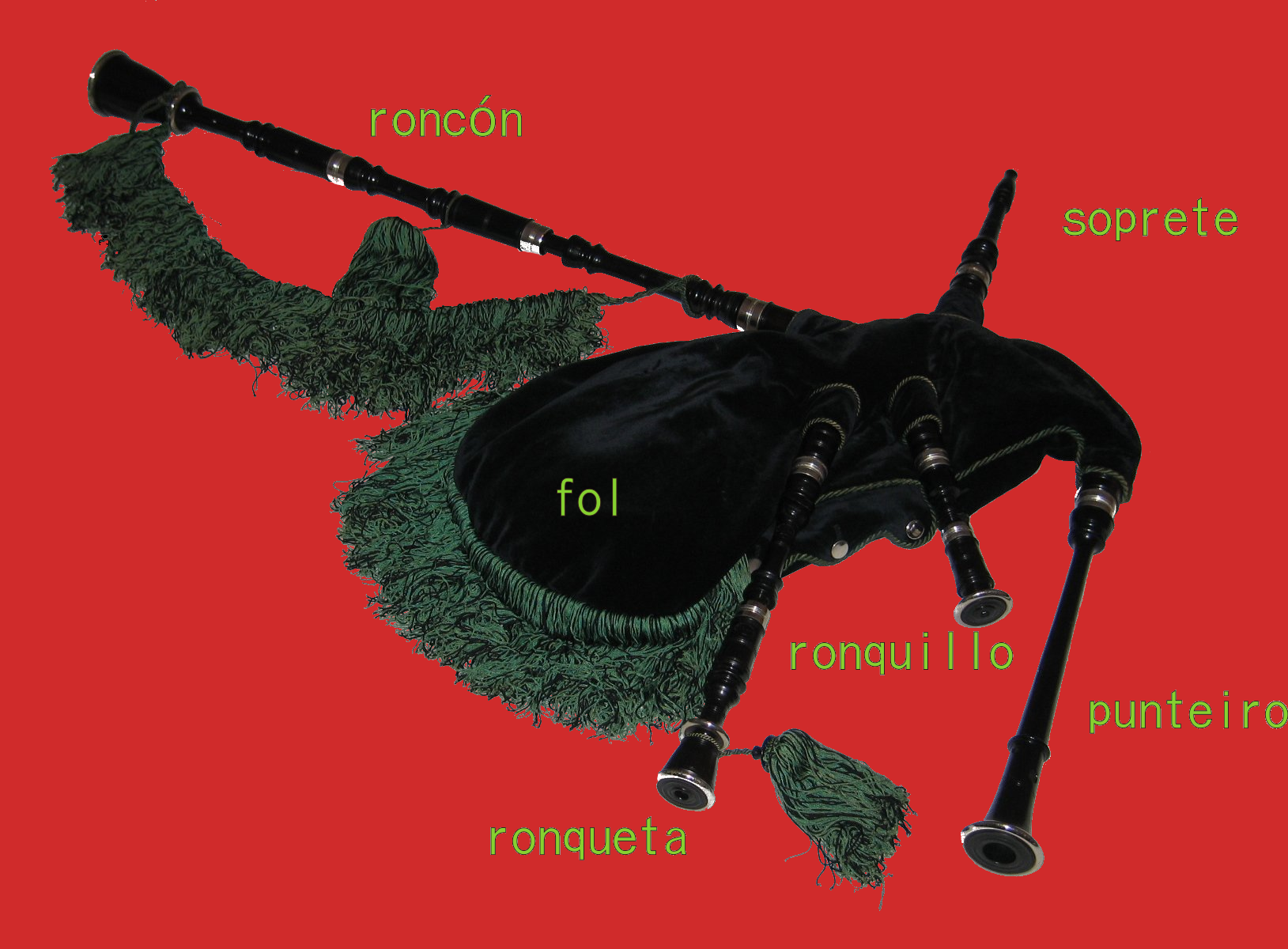
Galician gaita made by Xosé Manuel Seivane Rivas

The Galician gaita has a conical chanter and a bass drone (ronco) with a second octave. It may have one or two additional drones playing the tonic and dominant notes. Three keys are traditional: D (gaita grileira, lit. "cricket bagpipe"), C (gaita redonda), and B♭ (gaita tumbal). Galician pipe bands playing these instruments have become popular in recent years.

The playing of close harmony (thirds and sixths) with two gaitas of the same key is a typical Galician gaita style.

The bagpipe or gaita is known to have been popular in the Middle Ages, as early as the 9th century, but suffered a decline in popularity from the 16th century until a 19th-century revival. It saw another decline in the middle of the 20th century when the Francoist dictatorship tried to use it for propaganda purposes. Then, beginning in about the 1970s, a roots revival heralded another rebirth. The folk revival may have peaked in the late 1990s, with the release of acclaimed albums by Galician Carlos Núñez (A Irmandade Das Estrelas).

The gaita began to gain popularity with the massive immigration of Galicians to the United States and Latin America. The foundations of Galician Centers (Centro Galego / Casa Galicia) in key cities and capitals, from New York City to Buenos Aires, Argentina.

Traditional use include both solo performances or with a snare-drum known as tamboril (a wooden natural-skinned drum with gut snares), and the bombo, a bass drum.

=== Description ===
The player inflates the bag using his mouth through a tube fitted with a non-return valve. Air is driven into the chanter (Galician: punteiro) with the left arm controlling the pressure inside the bag. The chanter has a double reed similar to a shawm or oboe, and a conical bore with seven finger-holes on the front. The bass drone (ronco or roncón) is situated on the player's left shoulder and is pitched two octaves below the key note of the chanter; it has a single reed. Some bagpipes have up to two more drones, including the ronquillo or ronquilla, which sticks out from the bag and plays an octave above the ronco, or the smaller chillón. These two extra drones are located next to the right arm of the player.

The finger-holes include three for the left hand and four for the right, as well as one at the back for the left thumb. The chanter's tonic is played with the top six holes and the thumb hole covered by fingers. Starting at the bottom and (in the Galician fingering pattern) progressively opening holes creates the diatonic scale. Using techniques like cross-fingering and half-holing, the chromatic scale can be created. With extra pressure on the bag, the reed can be played in a second octave, thus giving range of an octave and a half from tonic to top note. It is also possible to close the tone hole with the little finger of the right hand, thus creating a semitone below the tonic.

=== Songs ===
Tunes using the gaita are usually songs, with the voice either accompanying the instrumentation or taking turns with it.

The most common type is the muiñeira, a sprightly 6/8 rhythm. Other 6/8 Galician tunes use different steps; they include the carballesa, ribeirana, redonda, chouteira and contrapaso.

Alborada, usually-instrumental tune, most often in 2/4, though sometimes 3/4, and is characterized by a series of descending turning phrases. It is used to begin a day's celebrations, and is played at sunrise.

The foliada is a joyful 3/4 jota-type song, often played at romarías (community gatherings at a local shrine).

== Famous gaita players ==
=== Galicia ===
- Avelino Cachafeiro
- Carlos Núñez
- Anxo Lorenzo
- Cristina Pato
- Susana Seivane

== See also ==
- List of bagpipes
- Associação Gaita-de-fole
