= List of folk festivals =

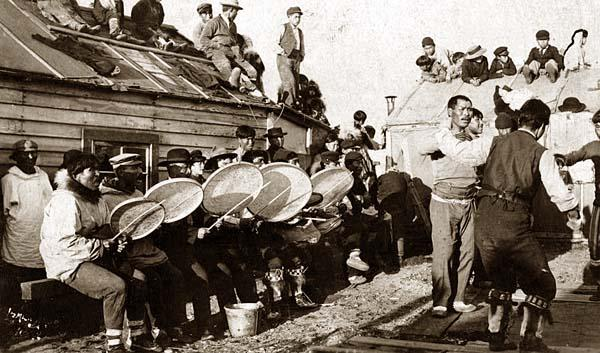
Inuit dance near Nome, Alaska, in 1900

A folk festival celebrates traditional folk crafts and folk music. This list includes folk festivals worldwide, except those with only a partial focus on folk music or arts. Folk festivals may also feature folk dance or ethnic foods.

Handicrafting has long been exhibited at such events and festival-like gatherings, as it has its roots in the rural crafts. Like folk art, handicraft output often has cultural, political, and/or religious significance. Folk art encompasses art produced from an indigenous culture or by peasants or other laboring tradespeople. In contrast to fine art, folk art is primarily utilitarian and decorative rather than purely aesthetic, and is often sold at festivals by tradespeople or practicing amateurs. As at folk festivals, such art and handicraft may also appear at historical reenactments and events such as Renaissance fairs.

== Africa ==
=== Morocco ===
- Bashikh festival
- Mata festival
- Marrakech Folklore days

=== South Africa ===
- Misty Waters Music Festival

== Asia ==
=== Bangladesh ===
- Dhaka International Folk Fest

=== India ===
- Gavari - Sacred Dance Drama Festival
- Raulane festival

=== Israel ===
- Jacob's Ladder

== Europe ==
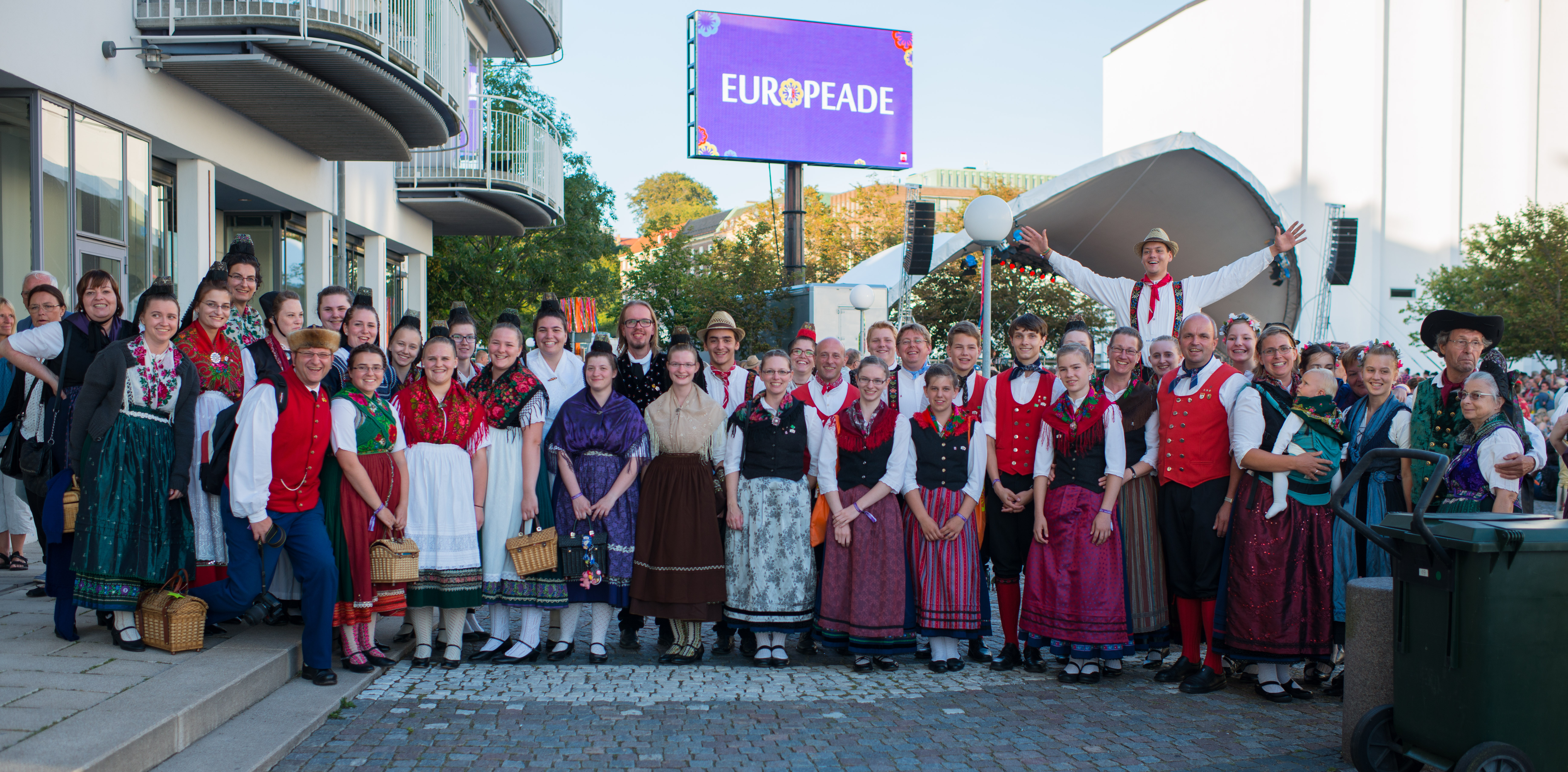
Dancers on the Europeade 2015 in Helsingborg in Sweden.

- Europeade (held each year in a different European country)

=== Bosnia and Herzegovina ===
- Ilidža Folk Music Festival
- Ilidža International Children's Folklore Festival

=== Belgium ===
- Boombal Festival

=== Bulgaria ===
- Stara planina fest Balkan folk

=== Denmark ===
- Tønder Festival

=== Estonia ===
- Viljandi Folk Festival

=== Finland ===
- Kaustinen Folk Music Festival

=== France ===
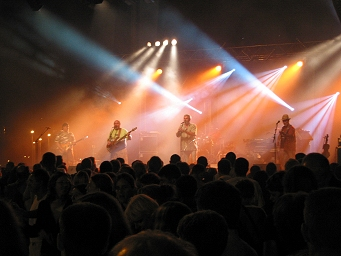
Festival Interceltique de Lorient (Inter-Celtic Festival of Lorient)

- Festival Interceltique de Lorient (Inter-Celtic Festival of Lorient)
- Rencontres Internationales de Luthiers et Maîtres-Sonneurs

=== Germany ===
- Festival-Mediaval XIV, "Folk of the World"

=== Greece ===
- Kerasovo Festival, Ioannina

=== Ireland ===
- Temple Bar TradFest

=== Lithuania ===
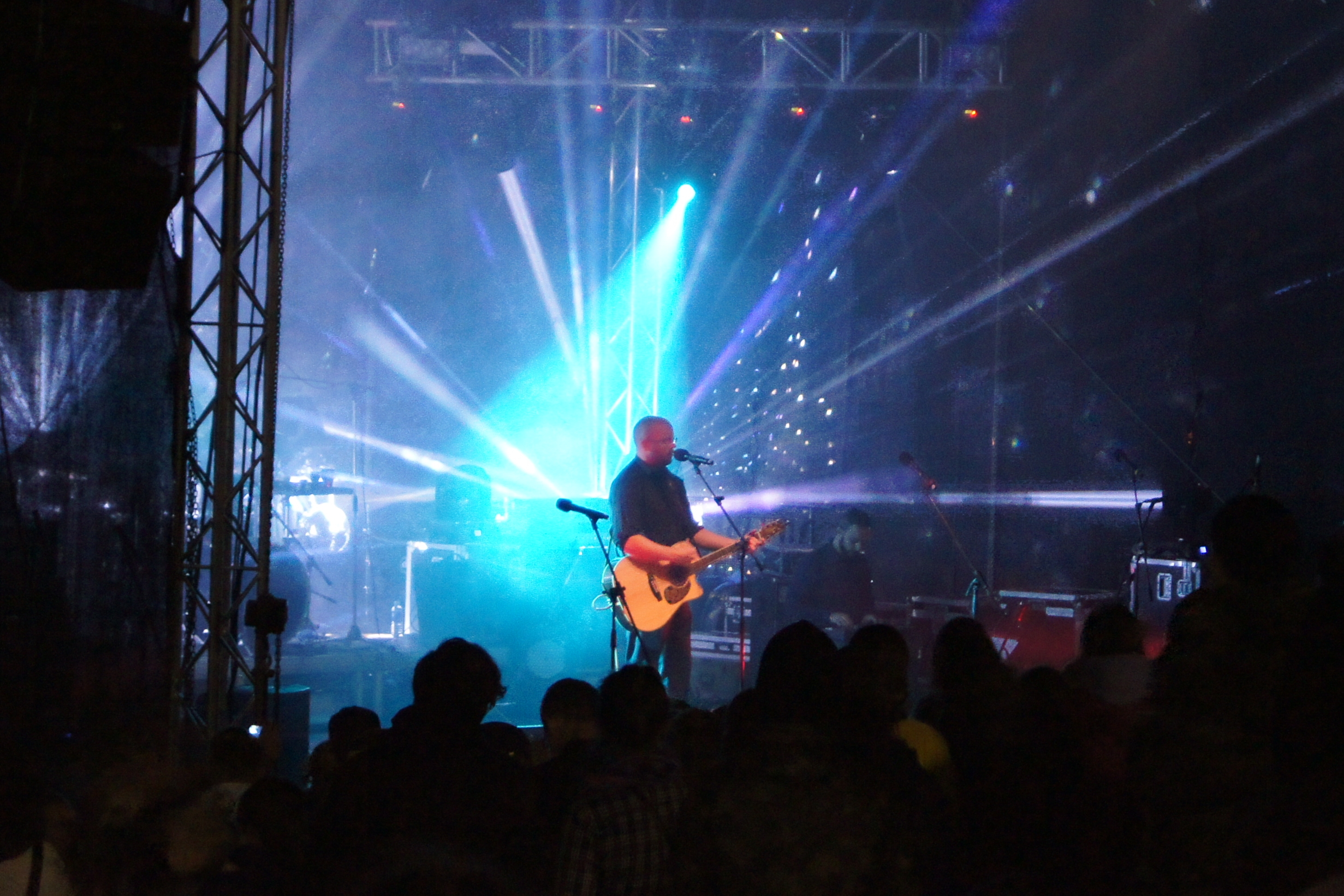
Experimental neofolk act Rome performing on the Mėnuo Juodaragis (Black-Horned Moon) big stage in 2013

- Kaziuko mugė (Saint Casimir's Fair), Vilnius
- Mėnuo Juodaragis (Black-Horned Moon or Moon of the Black Horn), Zarasai
- Parbėg laivelis (Little Ship Is Coming Back), Klaipėda

=== Netherlands ===
- Castlefest
- Worldfestival Parade Brunssum

=== Russia ===
- Empty Hills, Kaluga Oblast
- Grushinsky festival, near Samara

=== Spain ===
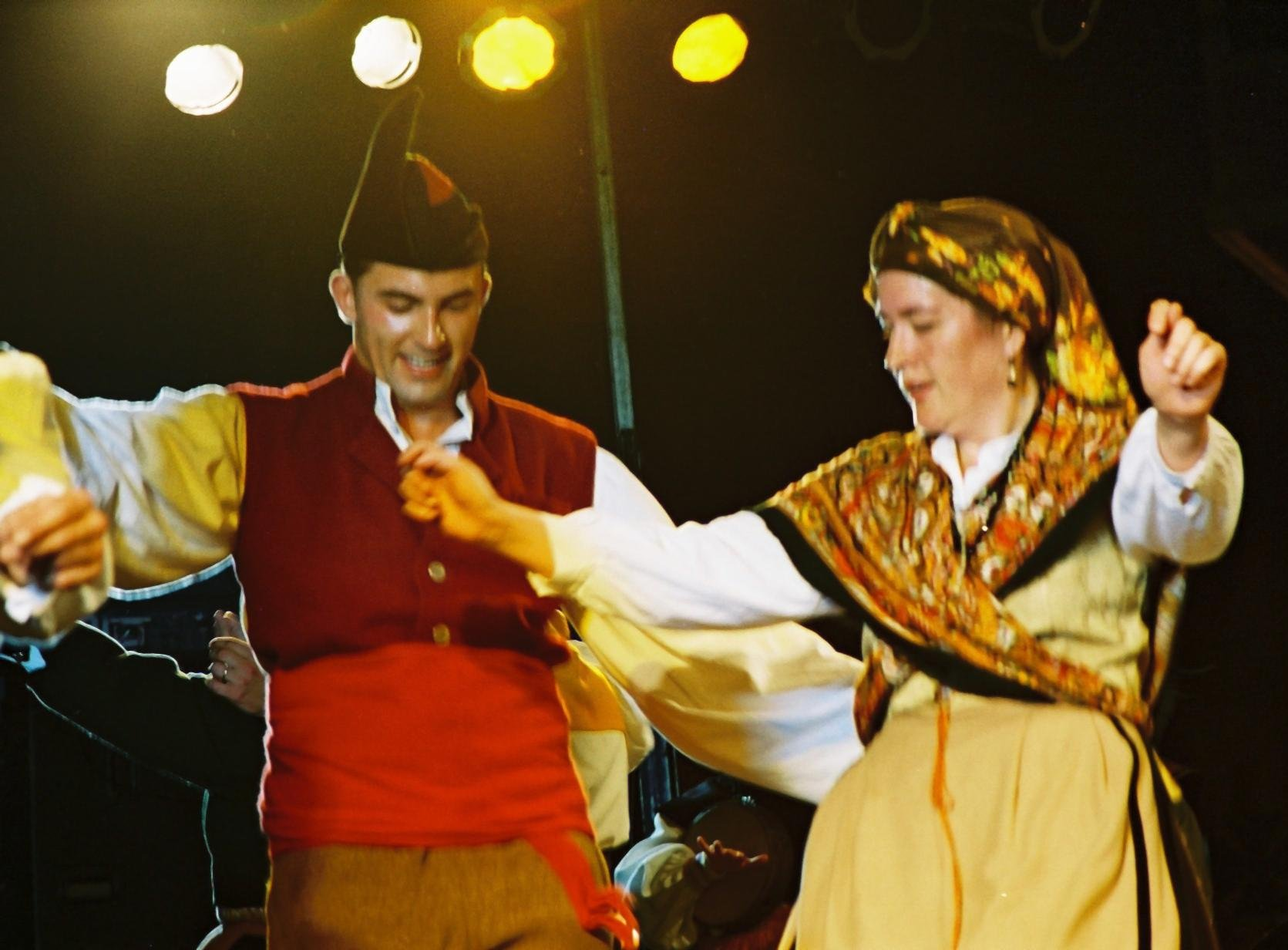
The 2004 Interceltic Festival of Avilés in Asturias, Spain

- Interceltic Festival of Avilés
- Interceltic Festival of Morrazo
- Ortigueira's Festival of Celtic World

=== United Kingdom ===
- Inter Varsity Folk Dance Festival (location changes each year)

==== England ====
- Beverley Folk Festival, Beverley, East Riding of Yorkshire
- Cambridge Folk Festival, Cherry Hinton, Cambridge, Cambridgeshire
- England's Medieval Festival, Nutley, East Sussex
- Fairport's Cropredy Convention, Cropredy, Oxfordshire
- FolkEast, Somerleyton Hall (near Somerleyton), Suffolk
- Middlewich Folk and Boat Festival, Middlewich, Cheshire
- Shrewsbury Folk Festival, Shrewsbury, Shropshire
- Sidmouth Folk Festival, Sidmouth, Devon
- White Horse Folk Festival, Grove, Oxfordshire
- Wickham Festival, Wickham, Hampshire
- Wimborne Folk Festival, Wimborne Minster, Dorset

==== Northern Ireland ====
- Soma Festival, Castlewellan, County Down

==== Scotland ====
- Celtic Connections, Glasgow
- Edinburgh Folk Festival, Edinburgh
- Shetland Folk Festival, Shetland

==== Wales ====
- Between the Trees, Merthyr Mawr
- Green Man Festival, Brecon Beacons

== North America ==
=== Canada ===
- Emerald Music Festival

==== Alberta ====
- Calgary Folk Music Festival, Calgary
- Canmore Folk Music Festival, Canmore
- Edmonton Folk Music Festival, Edmonton

==== British Columbia ====
- Vancouver Folk Music Festival, Vancouver

==== Manitoba ====
- Winnipeg Folk Festival, Birds Hill Provincial Park, Winnipeg

==== Newfoundland and Labrador ====
- Newfoundland & Labrador Folk Festival, St. John's

==== Nova Scotia ====
- Celtic Colours, Cape Breton Island
- Lunenburg Folk Harbour Festival, Lunenburg
- Stan Rogers Folk Festival, Canso

==== Ontario ====
- CityFolkFestival, Ottawa
- Hillside Festival, Guelph
- Home County Folk Festival, London
- Mariposa Folk Festival, Orillia
- Mill Race Festival of Traditional Folk Music, Cambridge
- Northern Lights Festival Boréal, Greater Sudbury
- Red Rock Folk Festival, Red Rock
- Summerfolk Music and Crafts Festival, Owen Sound
- TD Canada Trust Sunfest, London

==== Saskatchewan ====
- Regina Folk Festival, Regina

=== Honduras ===
- Encuentro Folklórico Nacional El Grande de Grandes

=== United States ===
==== Alaska ====
- Alaska Folk Festival

==== Arizona ====
- Tucson Folk Festival

==== California ====
- Big Sur Folk Festival
- Hardly Strictly Bluegrass Festival

==== District of Columbia ====
- Smithsonian Folklife Festival

==== Florida ====
- Florida Folk Festival

==== Illinois ====
- Fox Valley Folk Music And Storytelling Festival

==== Indiana ====
- Feast of the Hunters' Moon

==== Maine ====
- American Folk Festival

==== Massachusetts ====
- Lowell Folk Festival
- New England Folk Festival

==== Montana ====
- Montana Folk Festival

==== New Jersey ====
- New Jersey Folk Festival

==== New York ====
- Falcon Ridge Folk Festival
- Old Songs Festival

==== North Carolina ====
- Folkmoot USA
- NC Folk Festival

==== North Dakota ====
- Norsk Høstfest

==== Oklahoma ====
- Woody Guthrie Folk Festival

==== Oregon ====
- Sisters Folk Festival

==== Pennsylvania ====
- Flood City Music Festival
- Philadelphia Folk Festival
- Pittsburgh Folk Festival

==== Rhode Island ====
- Newport Folk Festival

==== Tennessee ====
- The Americana Folk Festival

==== Texas ====
- Kerrville Folk Festival

==== Traveling ====
- National Folk Festival

==== Washington ====
- Northwest Folklife

==== Wisconsin ====
- Great River Folk Fest
- Holiday Folk Fair
- Mile of Music

==== Wyoming ====
- Wyoming Folklife Festival

== Oceania ==
=== Australia ===
- National Folk Festival
- Woodford Folk Festival

=== New Zealand ===
- Whare Flat Folk Festival - held over the New Year period at Whare Flat near Dunedin; run by Dunedin's New Edinburgh Folk Club
