= Jesús Hernández =

Jesús Hernández may refer to:

== Sportspeople ==
=== Association football ===
- Jesús Hernández (footballer, born 1993), Venezuelan football forward for Carabobo
- Jesús Hernández (footballer, born August 2001), Mexican football attacking midfielder for Pachuca
- Jesús Hernández (footballer, born October 2001), Venezuelan football midfielder
- Jesús Hernández (footballer, born 2003), Spanish football defender/midfielder
- Jesús Hernández (footballer, born 2004), Mexican football forward for Elche Ilicitano

=== Other sports ===
- Jesús Hernández Úbeda (1959–1996), Spanish cyclist
- Oro (wrestler) (Jesús Javier Hernández Silva, 1971–1993), Mexican professional wrestler
- Jesús Fernández Hernández (born 1975), Spanish basketball player
- Jesús Hernández (cyclist) (born 1981), Spanish road bicycle racer
- Jesus Hernandez (racing driver) (born 1981), developmental driver for Earnhardt Ganassi Racing
- Jesús Hernández Hernández (born 1991), Mexican Paralympic swimmer

== Other people ==
- Jesús Hernández Tomás (1907–1971), Spanish communist leader during the Spanish Civil War
- Jesús Sanoja Hernández (1930–2007), Venezuelan journalist, historian and writer
