= MNF =

MNF may refer to:

== Music ==
- Maata Näkyvissä Festival, Finland

== Chemical elements ==
- Manganese(III) fluoride, MnF_{2} and MnF_{4}

== Political organizations ==
- Mizo National Front, Mizoram, India
  - Mizo National Front (Democratic), split from the Mizo National Front
- Mwalimu Nyerere Foundation, Tanzania

== Television shows ==
- Monday Night Football, a live game telecast of the NFL on ABC and ESPN
- Monday Night Football (Sky Sports), televised Premier League football

== Places ==
- Monongahela National Forest, West Virginia, US

== Military ==
- Multinational Force in Lebanon, an international peacekeeping force created in 1982
- Multi-National Force – Iraq, MRF-I
