= Sanoja =

Sanoja is a surname which is common in Venezuela and the Dominican Republic.

== People with the name ==
- Chucho Sanoja (1926–1998), Venezuelan musician
- Javier Sanoja (born 2002), Venezuelan baseball player
- Jesús Sanoja Hernández (1930–2007), Venezuelan journalist, historian, and writer
- Sonia Sanoja (1932–2017), Venezuelan dancer, teacher, choreographer, and poet
