= Dance in Venezuela =

Performing arts in Venezuela

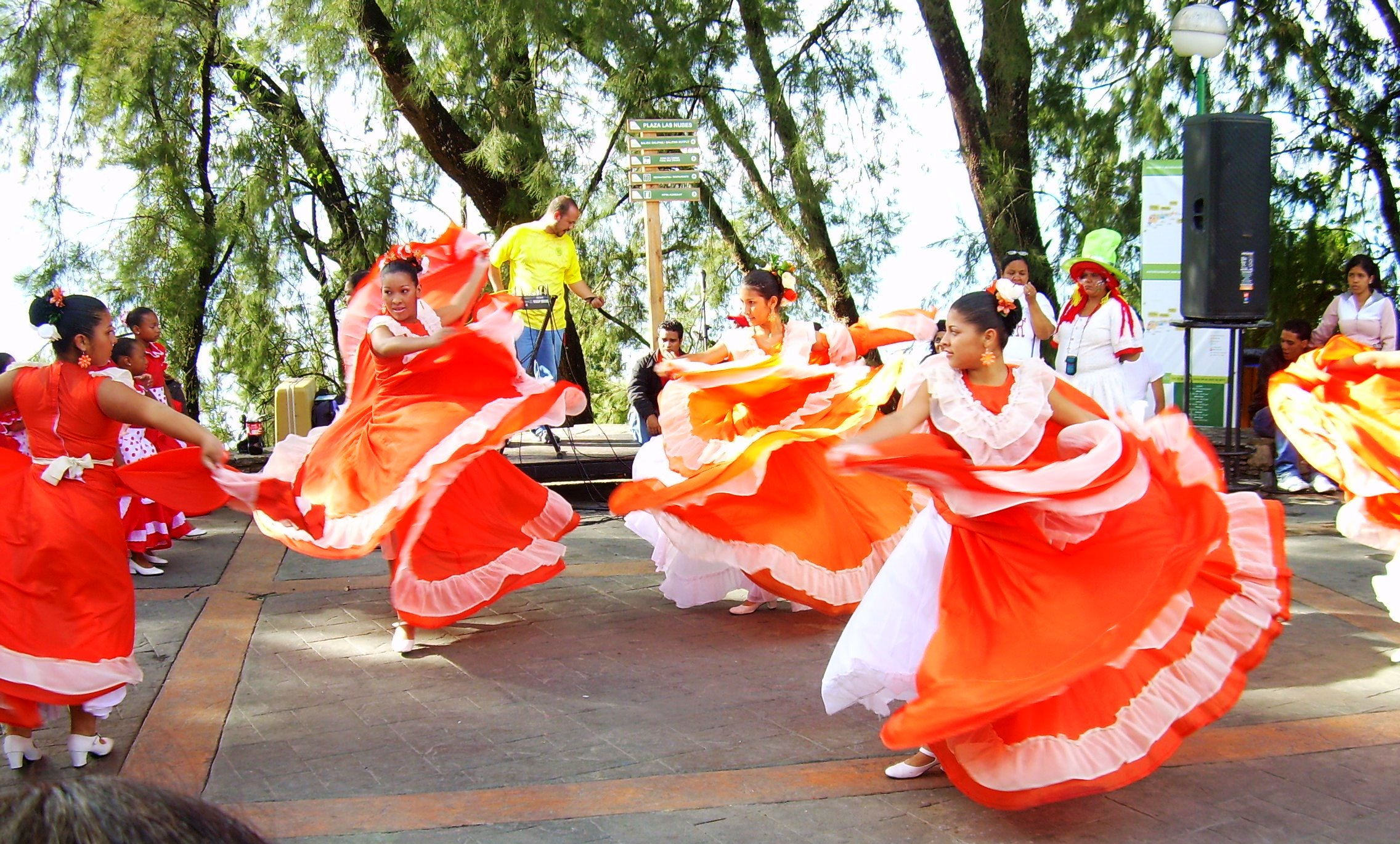
Joropo performance at Warairarepano National Park.

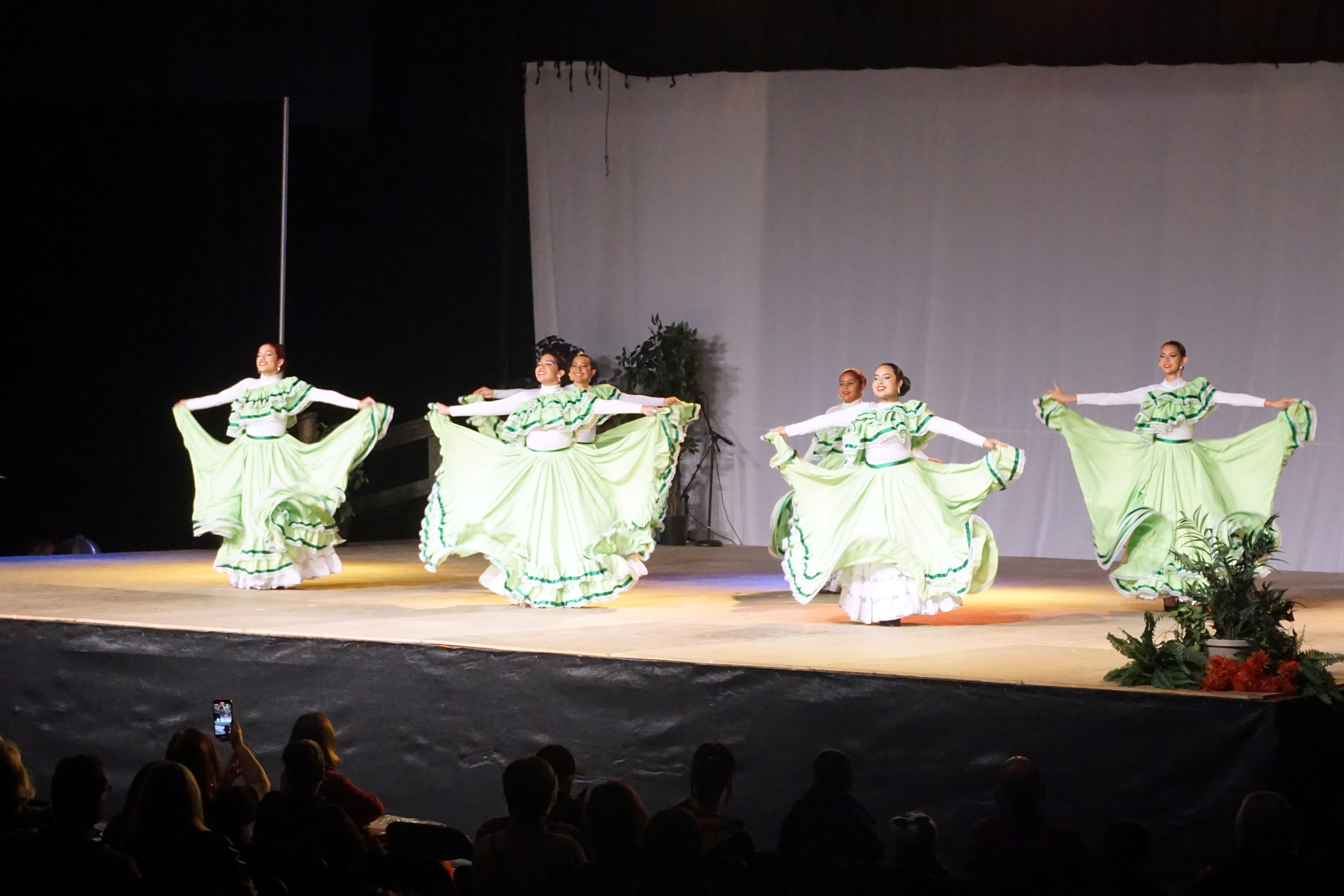
Venezuelan Guest Group dance performance at the 2023 Holiday Folk Fair International

Most of Venezuela's dances originated in the Caribbean and integrated African and European styles into indigenous culture. They include the national dance joropo, Venezuelan salsa, Venezuelan merengue, and the Baile de San Juan, also called tambor. One of the pioneers of contemporary dance in Venezuela was choreographer Sonia Sanoja who received the National Dance Award in 1998 for her artistic career and contributions Venezuelan dance. Other major figures include Irma Contreras, who founded the National Ballet of Venezuela with her sister Margot Contreras. Other well known figures who have helped popularize Venezuelan dance include Yolanda Moreno, who toured with her dancing troupe across the United States in 1962 and performed on the Ed Sullivan Show.

== History ==
=== Pre-colonization period ===
Prior to Spanish colonization of the Americas, dance in what is now Venezuela was used predominantly in religious ceremonies.

=== Colonial Venezuela ===
The Spanish fandango was danced widely in Venezuela during the colonial era.

=== Independent Venezuela ===
After the Venezuelan independence in the early 19th century, dancing for entertainment became more common. These dances included the zarzuela, sainete, and musical comedies.

=== 20th century ===
In 1917, Anna Pavlova and her touring ballet company visited Venezuela; it was the first time ballet had been performed in the country. Later, in 1930, Gally de Mamay began teaching ballet in private Venezuelan homes. One of de Mamay's students, Nena Coronil founded the National School of Ballet in 1948. This was followed in 1957 by the founding of the National Ballet of Venezuela by Irma Contreras in 1957; the company disbanded in 1968. One of the students of the National Ballet was Zhandra Rodríguez, who left the National Ballet to become the principal dancer of the American Ballet Theatre. Other troupes, including Ballet Internacional de Caracas and Ballet Nuevo Mundo de Caracas, directed by Rodríguez, were successors to the original company.

In the 1950s, singer Yolanda Moreno formed the group Danzas Venezolanas, which adapted traditional Venezuelan dances for the stage. The troupe was known in English as the Venezuelan Folklore Ballet and toured across 18 American states in the early 1960s.

== Varieties ==
=== Baile de San Juan ===
Baile de San Juan, also known as tambor, is a dance of Afro-Venezuelan origins.

=== Joropo ===
Joropo is the national dance of Venezuela. Danced in couples, it blends indigenous origins with African and Spanish influences, including the fandango.

=== Venezuelan salsa ===
Venezuelan salsa was born in the barrios of Caracas, Venezuela by street musicians who gather to "rock" the slums. Venezuelan salsa has a unique style compared to other forms of salsa as it incorporates quick rhythmic changes on the bass (as compared to the clave of New York style salsa and the salsa of Puerto Rico, which arguably was influenced by New York City, and opposed to the slower sons of Cuba). Venezuelan couples dance salsa cheek to cheek.

=== Other folk dances ===
On the border of the states Lara and Falcón, a formation dance known as las turas is performed in late September as part of regional celebrations for the Virgin de Las Mercedes; however, it was originally an indigenous harvest dance. It is performed in a circle and depicts the various types of agricultural work done during the harvest.

== See also ==
- Music of Venezuela
- Sonia Sanoja
