= Gatorade Center =

Indoor sports arena in Finland

- Turkuhalli (Finnish); Åbohallen (Swedish)
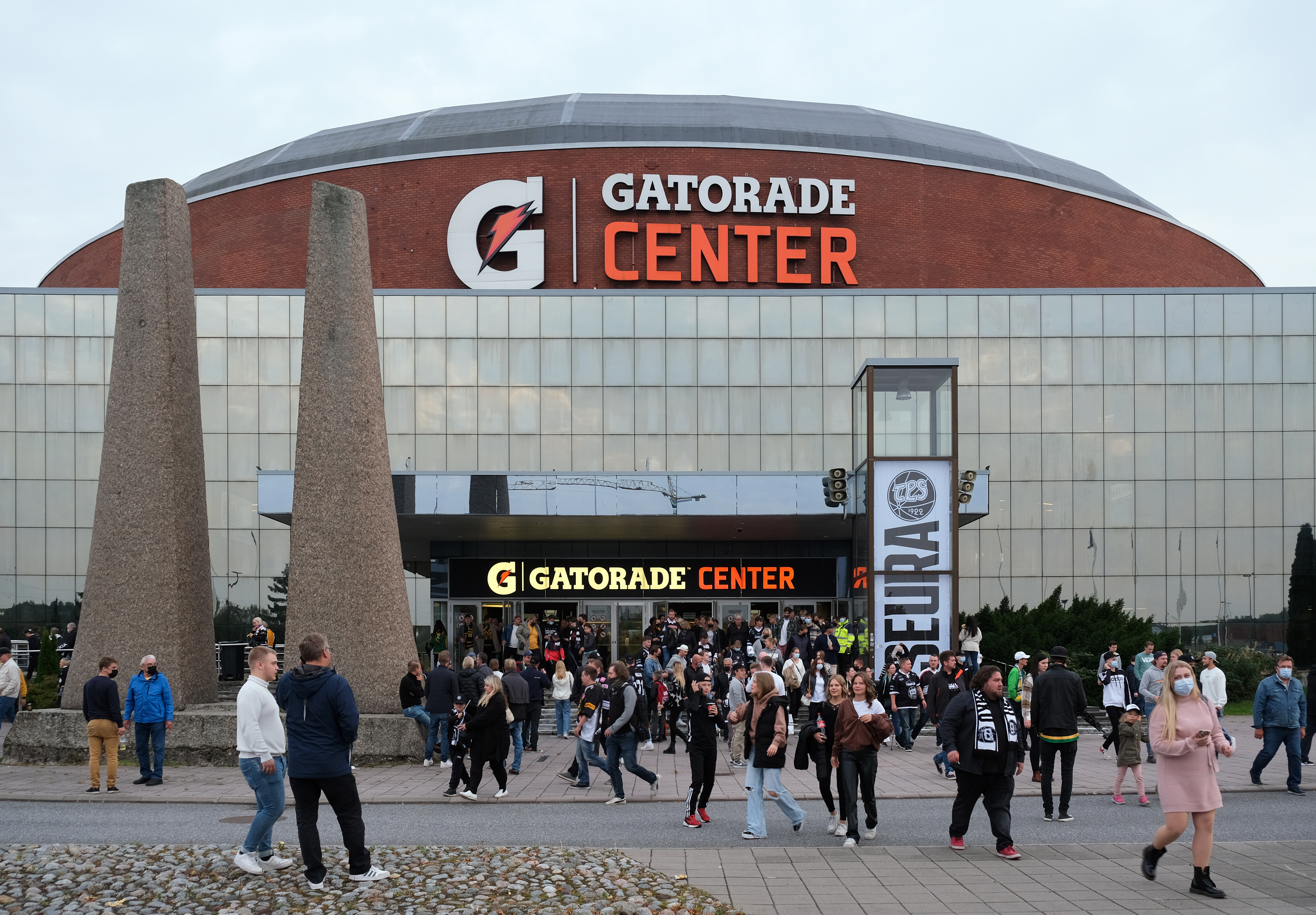
- Entrance to Gatorade Center (2021)
- Interactive map of Gatorade Center
- Former names: Typhoon (1990–1994); Elysée Arena (1994–2006); Turkuhalli (2006–2010); HK Areena (2010–2016)
- Location: Artukaistentie 8, Turku, Finland
- Coordinates: 60°27′23″N 22°11′13″E
- Owner: Oy Turkuhalli-Åbohallen Ab
- Capacity: 10,500; 11,820 (Original capacity)
- Surface: Versatile

Construction
- Groundbreaking: March 1989
- Opened: 25 November 1990
- Renovated: 1996–97, 2016–18
- Expanded: 1996–97
- Cost: 24 million EUR
- Architects: Casagrande and Haroma Oy

Tenants
- HC TPS (1990–present); TuTo (1995–96, 2005–2006); TPS Salibandy (2007–present, some games); Turun NMKY (2007–present, some games)

The Gatorade Center (commonly referred to as Turkuhalli in Finnish and Åbohallen in Swedish) is a multi-functional indoor arena in the district of Artukainen in Turku, Finland. Opened in November 1990, it can hold 10,500 spectators for ice hockey games.

It is primarily used for ice hockey, and is the home arena of TPS, but it is also frequently used to host concerts and other events such as the Maata Näkyvissä Festival. A record attendance of 12,041 for a hockey match was registered in 1991.

== History ==
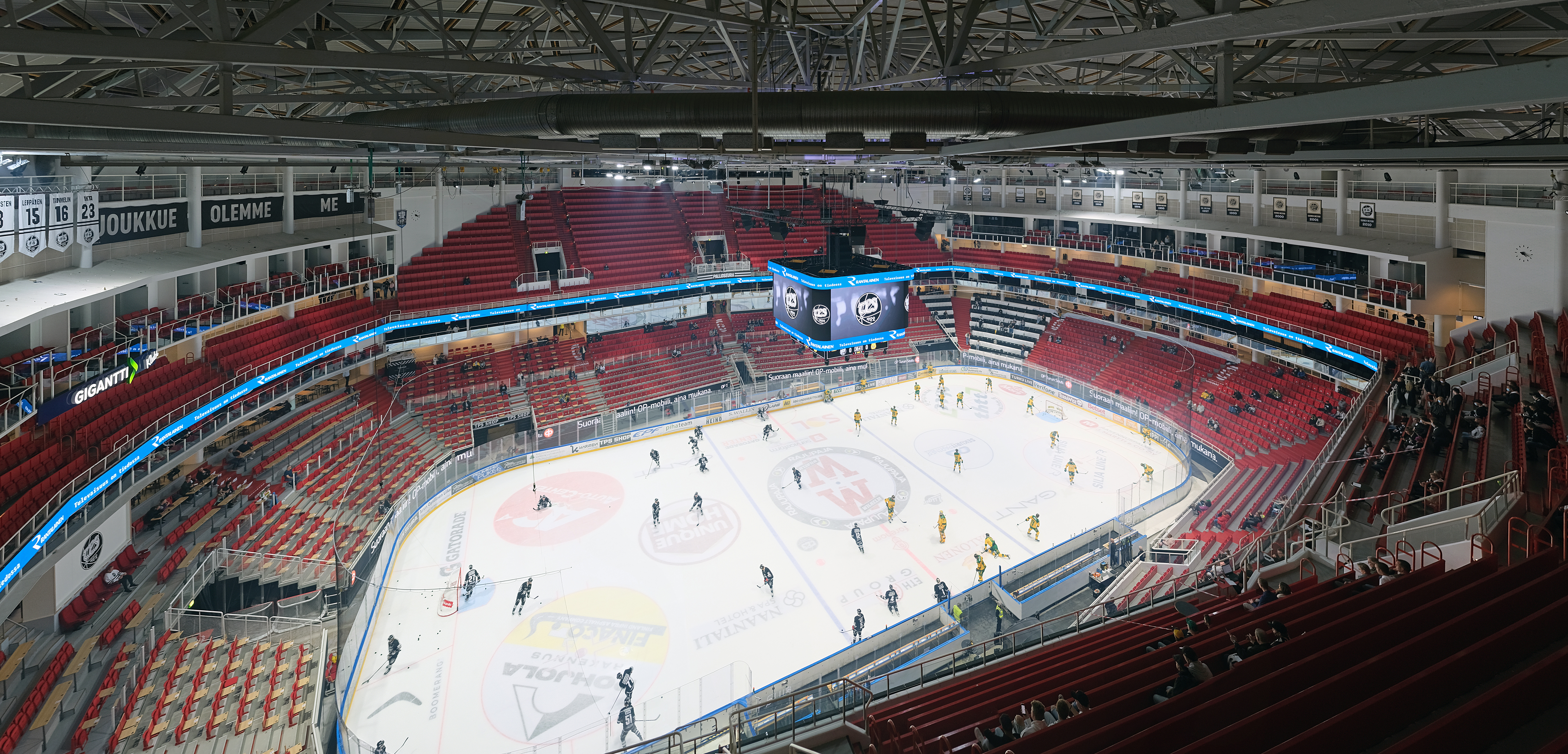
The arena during an ice hockey match (2021)

The arena, Turku Fair and Congress Centre, and a riding school were built on the former runways of the Artukainen Airport (1935–1955), which served as the main airport of Turku until Turku Airport was built in 1955.

The arena was built for the needs of hosting the Ice Hockey World Championships, during which it was the main venue of the games. There were, among others, matches of the group stage and the final stage of the tournament.

=== Construction ===
It was the first arena to be built in Finland with a capacity of more than 10,000 people. It was not until 1997 that a larger venue was opened, this being Hartwall Arena in the Finnish capital Helsinki.

The Gatorade Center was designed by architectural firm Casagrande and Haroma Oy and cost 145 million Finnmarks (24.4 million euros). The city of Turku paid 95 million Finnmarks (16 million euros) towards this.

=== Opening ===
The arena was opened, as Typhoon Arena, on November 25, 1990 by the Minister of Transport and Communications, Ilkka Kanerva. The first hockey match that took place on that day was played between TPS Turku and SaiPa. It was renamed Elysée Arena after its main sponsor Marli in the summer of 1994 and retained this name until 2007. From the summer of 2006, the arena was called Turkuhalli, which has been used in marketing in addition to the sponsor's name since the early days of the venue.

In 1996 and 1997, the arena was extended by an annex, which contained a second entrance, 28 new VIP boxes, space for a new restaurant and a new vestibule. The extension cost was 6 million euros.

In 1998, the overall look of the arena's restaurants was redesigned by renovator Sedu Koskinen. A full renovation of the arena took place between 2016 and 2018.

Oy Turkuhalli-Åbohallen Ab, founded by the City of Turku in 1989, merged with Kiinteistö Oy Turku Monitoimihalli which owns the venue, in 2010. Kiinteistö Oy Turku Monitoimihalli is also wholly owned by the city.

In September 2016, the name of the arena changed from HK Arena to Gatorade Center, after the PepsiCo's sports drink.

== Events ==
Gatorade Center was the main venue for the 1991 Men's World Ice Hockey Championships and one of the venues in 1997 and 2003. It hosted Suomen euroviisukarsinta, the Finnish national final for the Eurovision Song Contest in 1991 and 1992.

Janet Jackson performed there on 13 May 1998 as part of her Velvet Rope Tour. Bon Jovi started the European leg of their Crush Tour at the arena on 5 August 2000. Enrique Iglesias performed at the arena during his Euphoria Tour on 6 April 2011. Bruce Springsteen had two shows on 7 and 8 May 2013 as part of his Wrecking Ball World Tour.

In 2017, the opening and closing of Europeade, the largest European costume and folklore festival took place in the arena.

== See also ==
- List of European ice hockey arenas
- List of indoor arenas in Finland
- List of indoor arenas in Nordic countries
- Ball Arena, which at one time also carried PepsiCo sponsorship.

Events and tenants
Preceded by Kupittaan jäähalli	HC TPS; Home arena 1990–present	Succeeded by Current
Preceded by Kupittaan jäähalli	TuTo; Home arena 1995–1996	Succeeded by Kupittaan jäähalli
Preceded by Kupittaan jäähalli	TuTo; Home arena 2005–2006	Succeeded by Kupittaan jäähalli
