= Whare Flat Folk Festival =

Annual music festival in Dunedin, New Zealand

Whare Flat Folk Festival is a music festival held annually over four days each New Year at Waiora Scout Camp in Whare Flat, located in the Silver Stream valley some 15 kilometres (9.3 mi) northwest of the city centre of Dunedin in the South Island of New Zealand. It has been held each year since 1975 and usually attracts international musical talent. In addition to professional acts, the Festival offers opportunities for attendees to improve their music and dance skills at workshops, join in with others at late-night sessions, or perform at open mic shows. For the purposes of the Festival, "folk" music is defined broadly to include any acoustic music; the programme regularly includes a two-hour slot of blues on one afternoon. Whare Flat Folk Festival is run entirely by volunteers.

== History ==
The Festival began its life in 1975 as the Whare Flat Folk Camp, a small gathering of local musicians meeting to play music together over a weekend. Thereafter it expanded rapidly; in 1989, for the only time in its history, it was not held at Waiora as organisers relocated to Orokonui north of Dunedin in an attempt to stem the growth of the event, which was creating security risks at the regular New Year's Eve cèilidh dance.

Since the 1990s the Festival has grown steadily, with attendance numbers near 700 in 2017 and approaching 1000 in 2020. In addition to local performers such as Nadia Reid, the Festival has featured international guests as varied as Eric Bogle, Patsy Seddon, and Women in Docs.

In January 2000, the fords providing access to Waiora Scout Camp were flooded by heavy rain, trapping festival-goers within the site for an extra day. The same happened again in January 2021; all those trapped were safely evacuated.

The 2021–2022 Festival was cancelled due to uncertainty regarding the status of COVID-19 by the end of December.
