= Wisconsin Exposition Center =

Exposition facility and exhibit hall

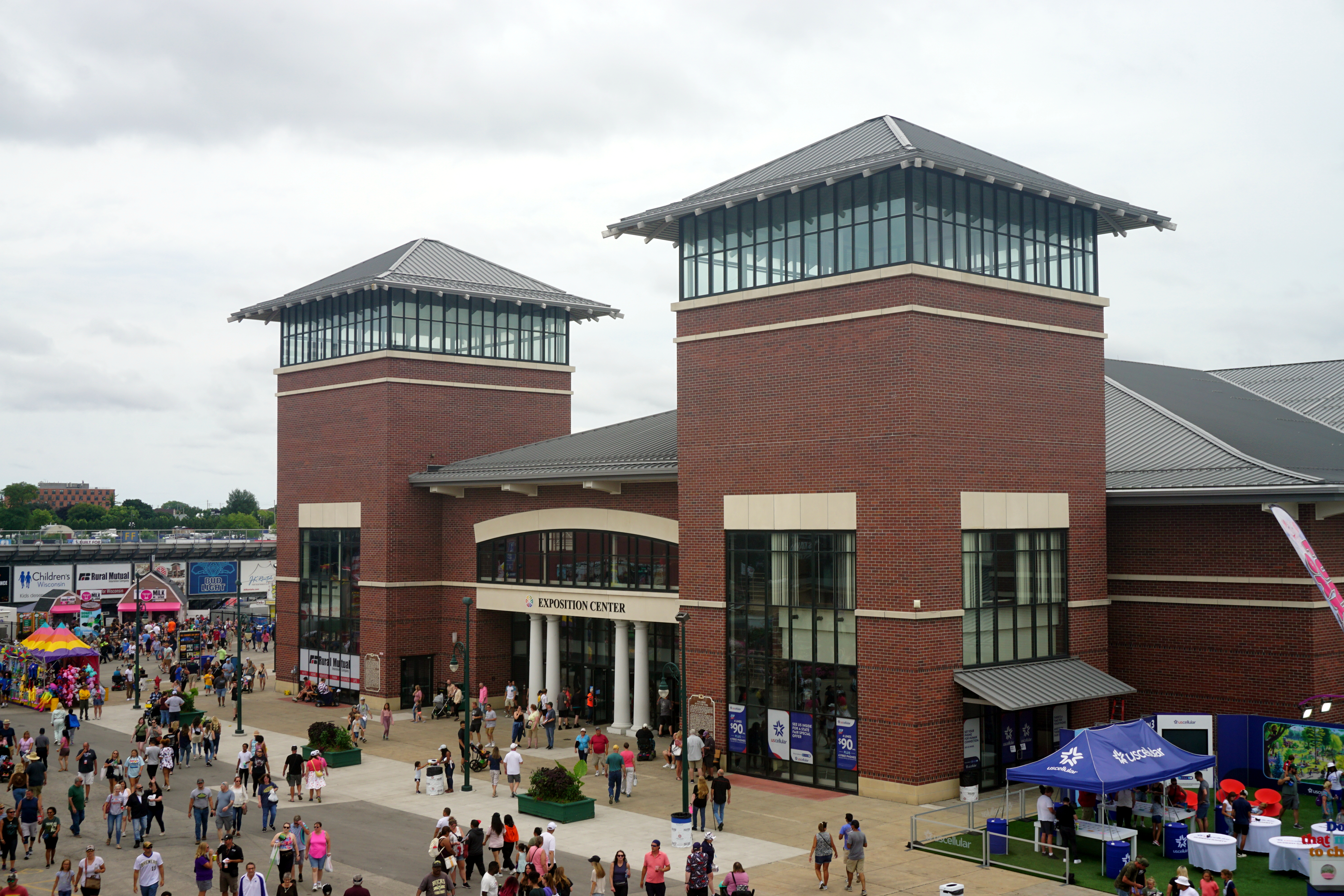
- Interactive map of Wisconsin Exposition Center
- Address: 8200 W Greenfield Ave.
- Location: West Allis, Wisconsin
- Coordinates: 43.018052°N 88.014339°W
- Owner: State of Wisconsin

Construction
- Opened: 2002

Website
- wistatefair.com/wsfp/exposition-center/

The Wisconsin Exposition Center is an exhibit hall and exposition facility located on the grounds of the Wisconsin State Fair Park in the Milwaukee suburb of West Allis, Wisconsin and commonly referred to as the "Expo Center". It is owned and operated by the State of Wisconsin and staffed by Wisconsin State Fair Park employees.

== Events ==
The Wisconsin Exposition Center is the state's second-largest exhibit hall with up to 198,989 square feet (18,486.7 m^{2}) of space and nearly 10,000 on-site parking spots. Four large meetings rooms total 2,952 square feet (274.2 m^{2}) of exhibit space. The venue primarily hosts consumer shows, trade shows, food functions, conventions, and other public events.

The Expo Center hosts exhibits and entertainment during the 11-day Wisconsin State Fair as well as several annual events, including The Wonderful World of Weddings, the Milwaukee Boat Show, RV and Camping Show, the Milwaukee Journal Sentinel Sports Show, The Journal Sentinel Golf Show, the NARI Home Improvement Show, the Wisconsin Realtors' Home and Garden Show, Trainfest, and Holiday Folk Fair.

== History ==
The Expo Center was built in 2002 to replace the previous exhibit halls at State Fair Park.

In 2007, the Expo Center received a Travel Green Wisconsin certification, which is a recognition of tourism-related businesses that reduce their environmental impact through operations and other improvements.
