= Trainfest (Milwaukee) =

Model railroad show in Wisconsin, US

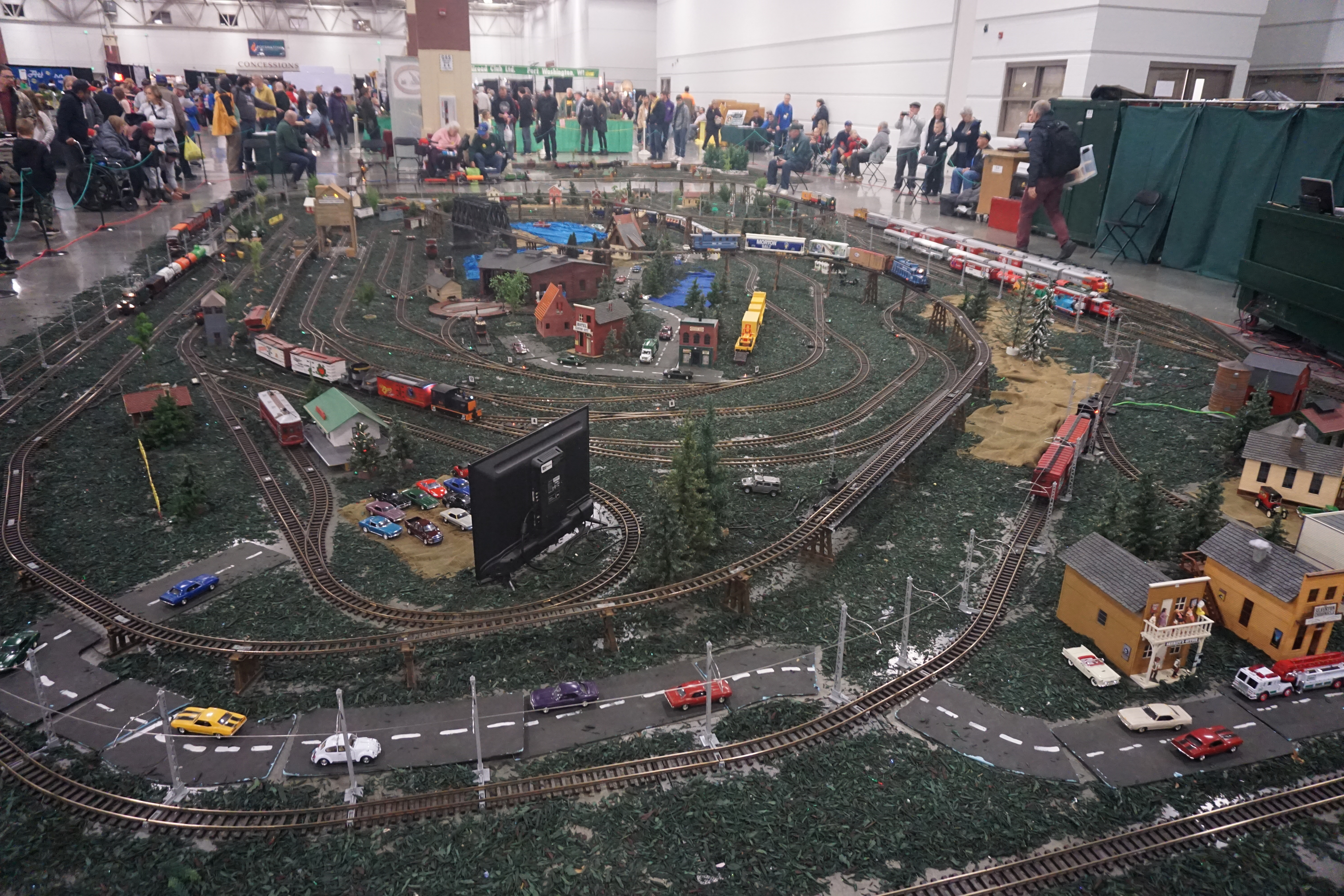
LGB Model Railroad Club of Chicago layout at Trainfest 2022

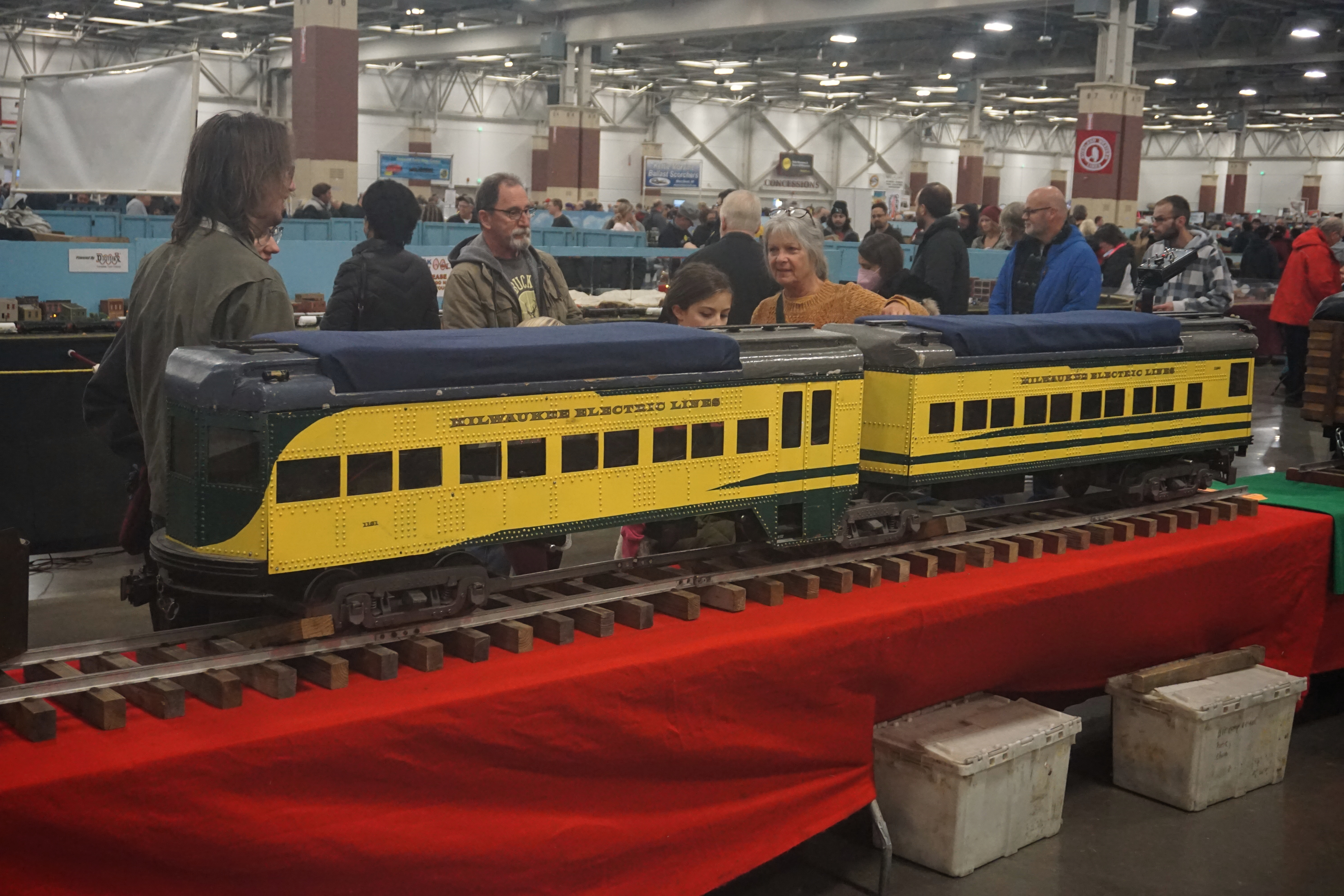
Milwaukee Light Engineering Society exhibit at Trainfest 2022

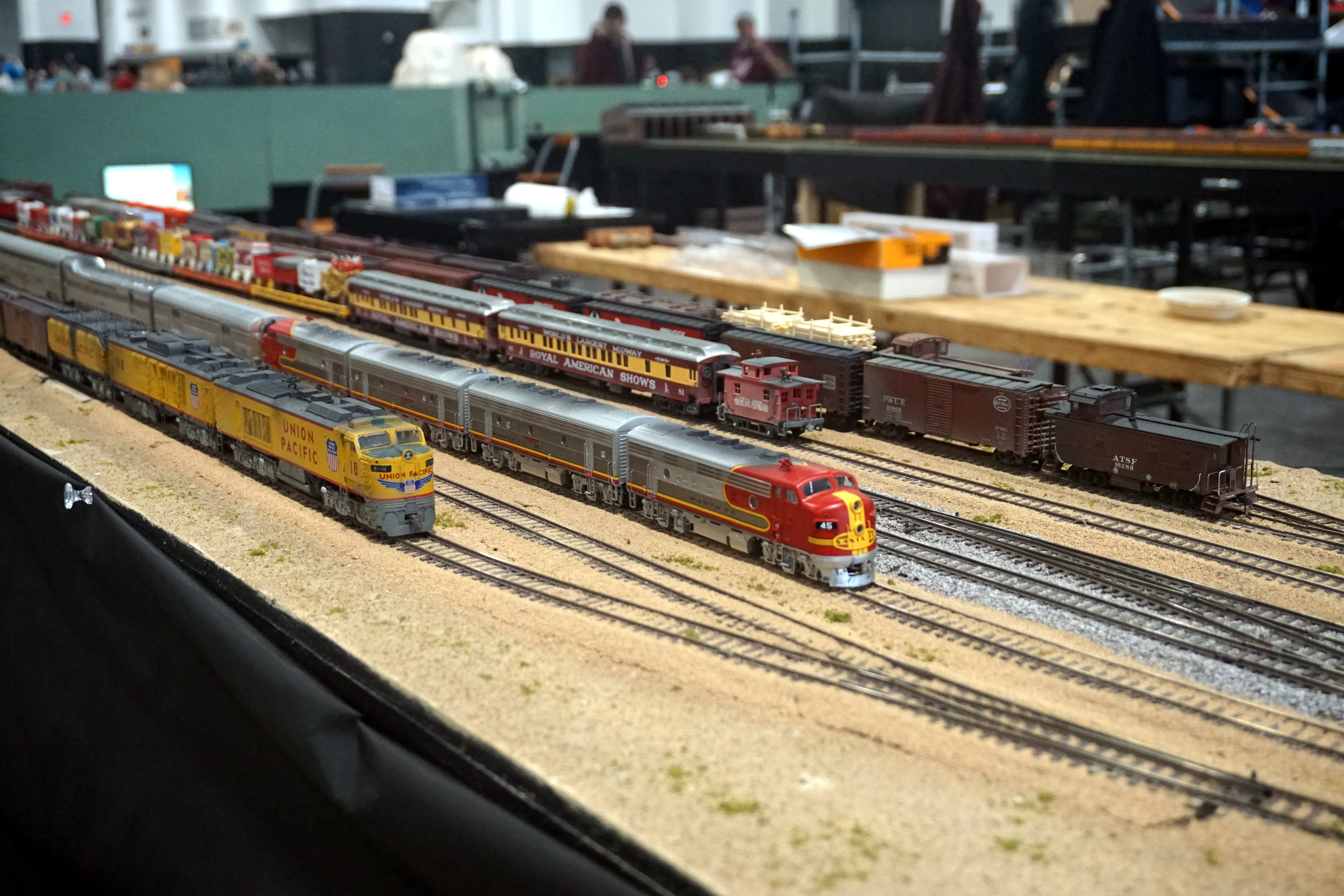
The Santa Fe All the Way Modular Layout at Trainfest 2024

Trainfest is a model railroad show that takes place annually in the Milwaukee suburb West Allis, Wisconsin. According to the show’s organizers, it is “America’s largest operating model railroad show” and markets itself to both hobbyists and young families.

== History ==
Trainfest started in 1971 as a one-day show in a Milwaukee Veterans of Foreign Wars hall. Today, Trainfest is a two-day event sponsored by the Wisconsin Southeastern (WISE) division of the National Model Railroad Association (NMRA) and takes over 200,000 square feet (19,000 m^{2}) of the Wisconsin Exposition Center during the second weekend of November. Despite a faltering economy, total attendance in 2008 rose to 21,621 from 20,979 in 2007.

Trainfest serves as both a showcase for trends in model railroading and a place where model railroaders can connect to share ideas about their hobby. Trainfest features at least 50 operating layouts, ranging from Z to G scale, some constructed by hobbyists and some constructed commercially. Over 60 manufacturers (including industry giants such as Walthers, Athearn, Bachmann Industries, Lionel, Atlas, Kalmbach Media, Märklin, and MTH Electric Trains) and 50 hobby dealers from across the country showcase their newest products and sample layouts.

Since there was no event planned in 2020, the 50th edition of Trainfest was deferred to 2021.

== Currently ==
In 2008, 12 historical groups exhibited at Trainfest, with some exhibitors featuring layouts depicting scenes from historical Wisconsin, including mining and logging, farm, and river and lake scenes.

In a 2008 West Allis Now feature story, executive director John Tews quoted that, “Some people think Trainfest is just a collector’s event, but it’s an event for everyone.” One of Trainfest’s stated goals is “passing along the traditional hobby of model railroading to a new generation.” The festival offers free admission to youngsters under 14 (with a coupon available on its Web site). Some exhibits are aimed toward children, such as a layout built from LEGO blocks, a kid-sized circus train replica, and interactive racing features. Trainfest has also partnered with Radio Disney to offer a live show and craft booth for the children in attendance.

== See also ==
- Rail transport modelling
- Milwaukee: City of Festivals
