= American Folk Festival =

American cult festival

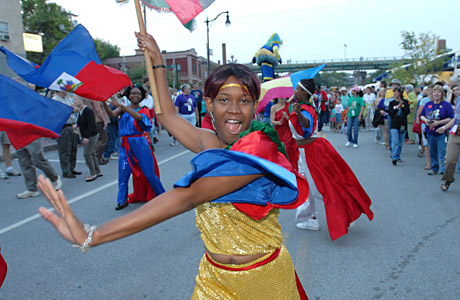
A dancer with Nadia Dieudonne & Feet of Rhythm performs at the American Folk Festival in Bangor, Maine in 2009.

The American Folk Festival is an annual folk festival held during August at Waterfront Park in Bangor, Maine. Founded in 2005, the festival is free and has an open admittance policy. A 2008 study showed that the festival brought in a total of 9.8 million dollars of tourism revenue to the city of Bangor.

In November 2019 the organizers of the festival announced they had the dissolved the organization and 2019 was the last time the American Folk Festival would be held
