= Artukainen =

City district in Turku, Finland

Coordinates: 60.4565°N 22.1806°E

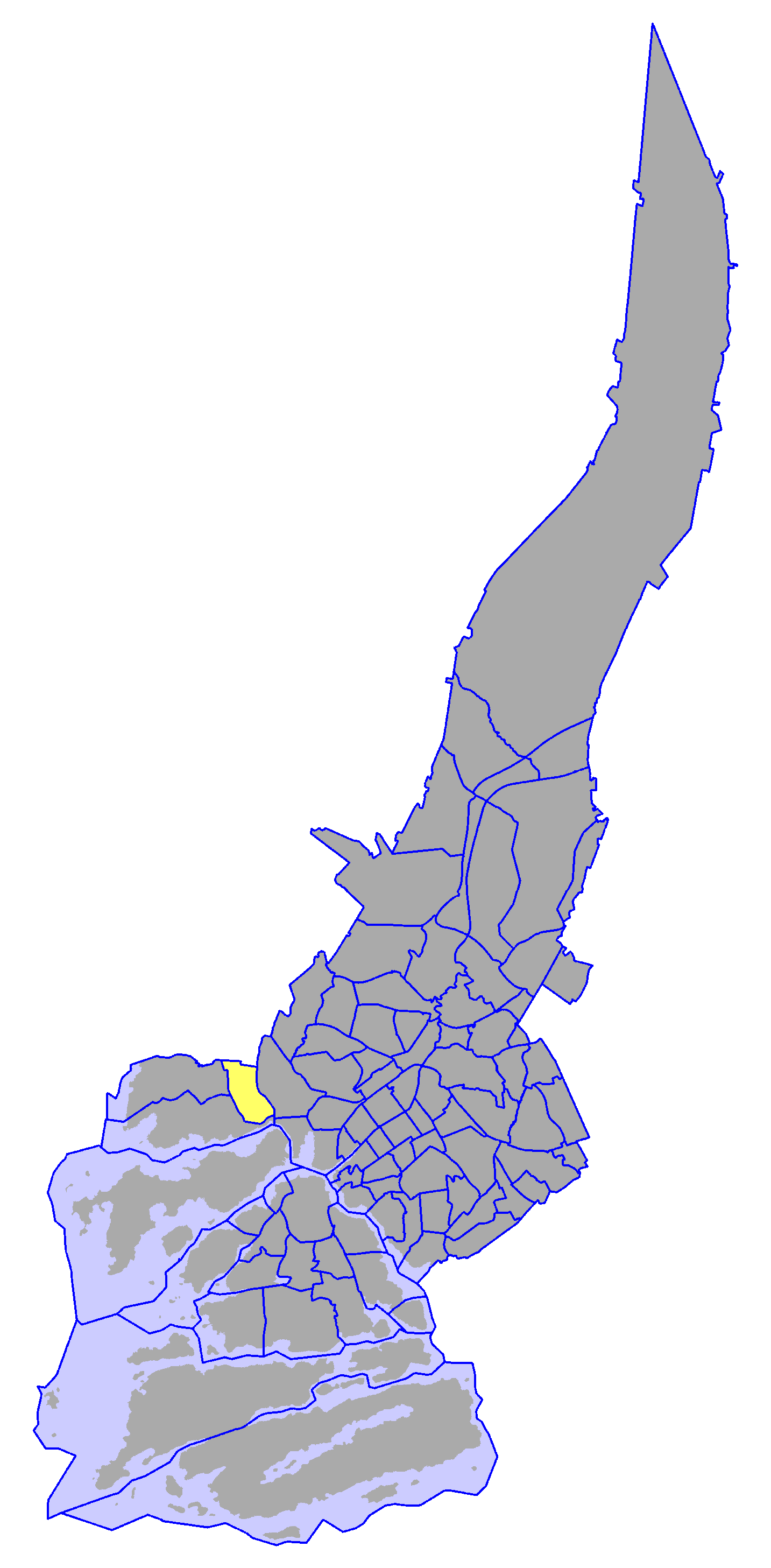
Artukainen on a map of Turku.

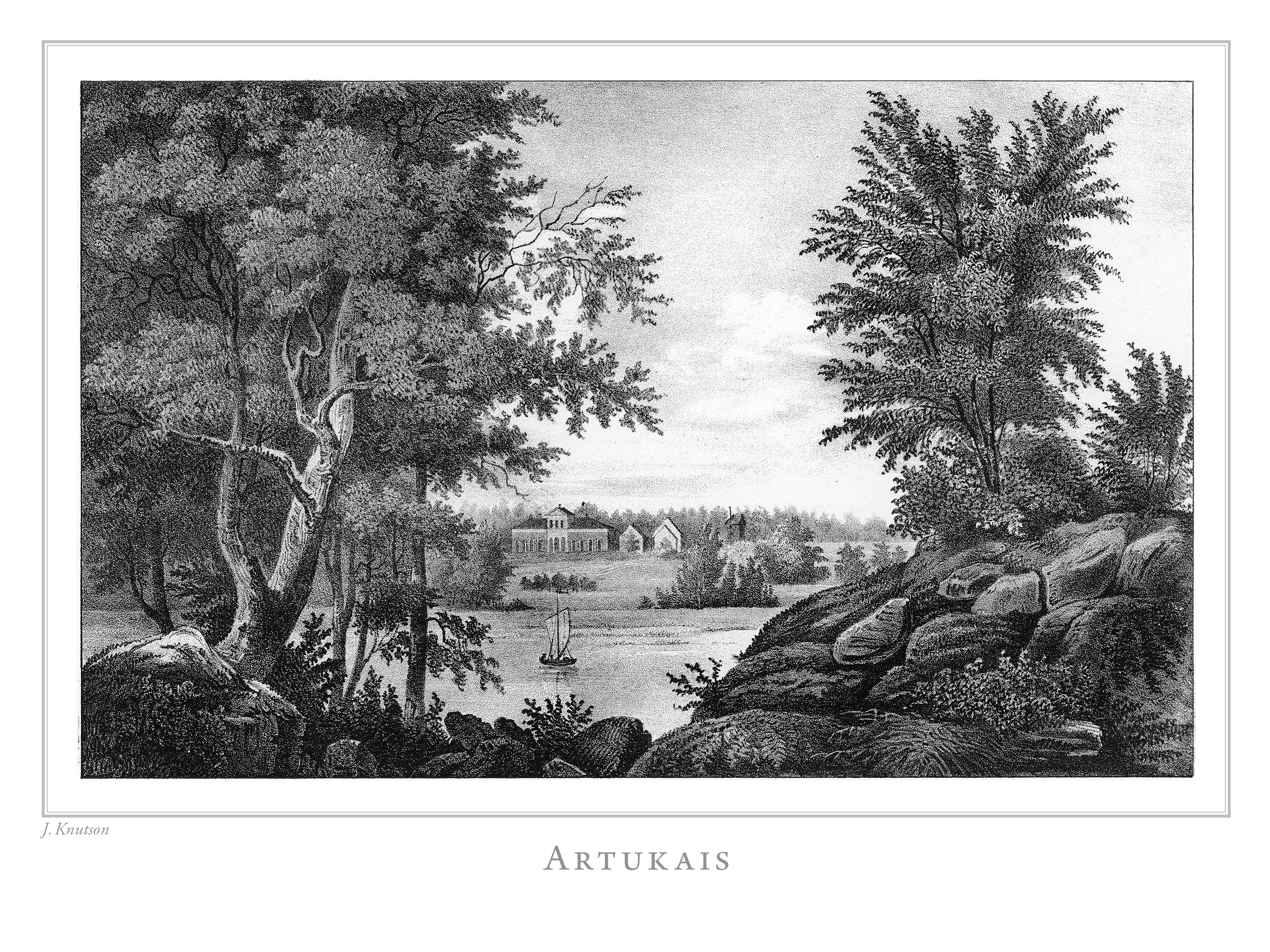
Illustration of Artukainen in Finland framstäldt i teckningar edited by Zacharias Topelius and published 1845-1852.

Artukainen (Swedish Artukais) is a district of the city of Turku, Finland. It is located in the western part of the city, five kilometres from the city centre. It has a population of 78 (as of 2004), making it one of the smallest districts of Turku. The district's relatively small population is due to its status as one of the biggest industrial concentrations in the city.

Finland's first airport was built in Artukainen in 1935. It served as the main airport of Turku until Turku Airport was built in 1955. The former runway of the Artukainen Airport is nowadays replaced with Turku Fair Centre, and an ice hockey stadium, Turkuhalli.

== See also ==
- Districts of Turku
- Districts of Turku by population
