= The Americana Folk Festival =

The Americana Folk Festival (2004–2009) (AFF) was an art and music event held at Montgomery Bell State Park in Dickson, Tennessee (near Nashville). The event featured folk music of various genres, particularly jazz, Americana, blues, and rock.

== History ==
The festival began in 2004 on the grounds of Montgomery Bell State Park in Dickson, with 200 festival goers. In 2005 there were 3000 festival goers. By 2009 the festival was attracting 4000 people. The festival is sponsored each year by Yazoo Brewing Company, the company provides an organic beer especially for the festival.

In 2010 a post on he Americana Folk Festival's Facebook page said, "We regret to announce that the Americana Folk Festival has been cancelled due to low ticket sales volume."

=== Format ===
The format of the festival calls for two acts to play at the same time with short sets of music. Festival goers can only see several songs of each performer before they leave the stage.
