= Empty Hills =

- Genre: Rock, Folk, Reggae, Jazz, Electronic, Avant-garde
- Dates: June
- Locations: Kaluga Oblast; Smolensk Oblast (2009)
- Years active: 2003–2011
- Website: holmi.ru

Empty Hills (Russian: Пустые холмы, romanized: Pustye Kholmy) was a non-commercial open-air alternative arts and music festival in Russia.

The festival was held annually since 2003, usually over several days in June, in Kaluga Oblast or Smolensk Oblast. It was a non-profit event with no admission fee or sponsorship. The efforts of volunteers were responsible for the production of the event.

Unlike most music festivals, Empty Hills had no specific musical format or style. Among genres represented on the festival, there were folk music, blues, rock music, reggae, sometimes electronic music, jazz or avant-garde.

== Event history ==
No.	Dates	Approximate location	Attendance
1	June 12–14, 2003	near Istomino	300
2	2004	near Lopatino and Lysaya Gora	1,500
3	2005	near Lopatino and Khomyakovo	3,000
4	June 9–12, 2006	near Latynino	7,000
5	2007	near Afanasovo	15,000
6	2008	near Bardino and Gorokhovka	15,000–40,000
7	2009	near Shibnevo and Pavlovskoye	35,000+
8	June 11–14, 2010	near Devyatovka and Gnezdilovo	20,000–80,000
9	June 9–3, 2011	near Bardino and Gorokhovka	50,000
