= Mwalimu Nyerere Foundation =

Tanzanian NGO

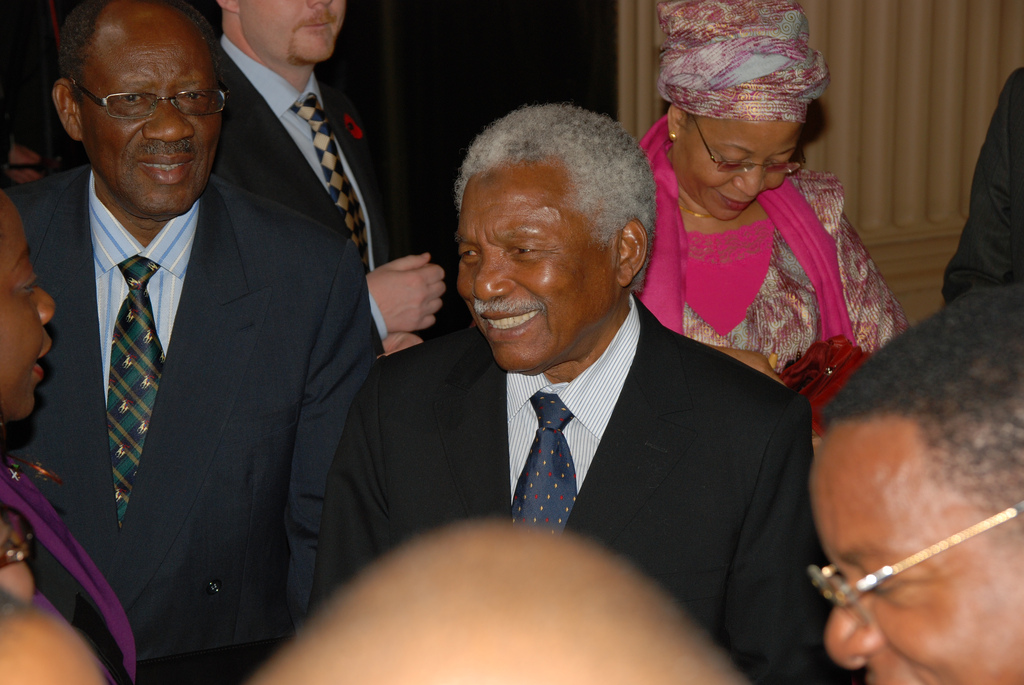
Executive Director of the Mwalimu Nyerere Foundation, Joseph Butiku (left), with former President Ali Hassan Mwinyi.

The Mwalimu Nyerere Foundation (MNF) is a non-governmental organisation based in Dar es Salaam, Tanzania. It serves as a pivotal platform for Tanzanian, African, and global stakeholders to engage, collaborate, and address the prevailing challenges concerning peace, security, and development across the continent. Anchored on the core tenets of peace, unity, and people-centred development, the foundation's initiatives are geared towards fostering positive change and progress. It is named after Tanzania's founding President, Julius Nyerere.

Established on June 14, 1996, in accordance with the Trustees Incorporation Act (CAP 375), the purpose of the Mwalimu Nyerere Foundation is "to try to play a modest role in bringing Peace, Unity and Development in Africa in particular and the World generally. In carrying on that task, we will need partner, genuine partners, from outside Africa, including Europe."

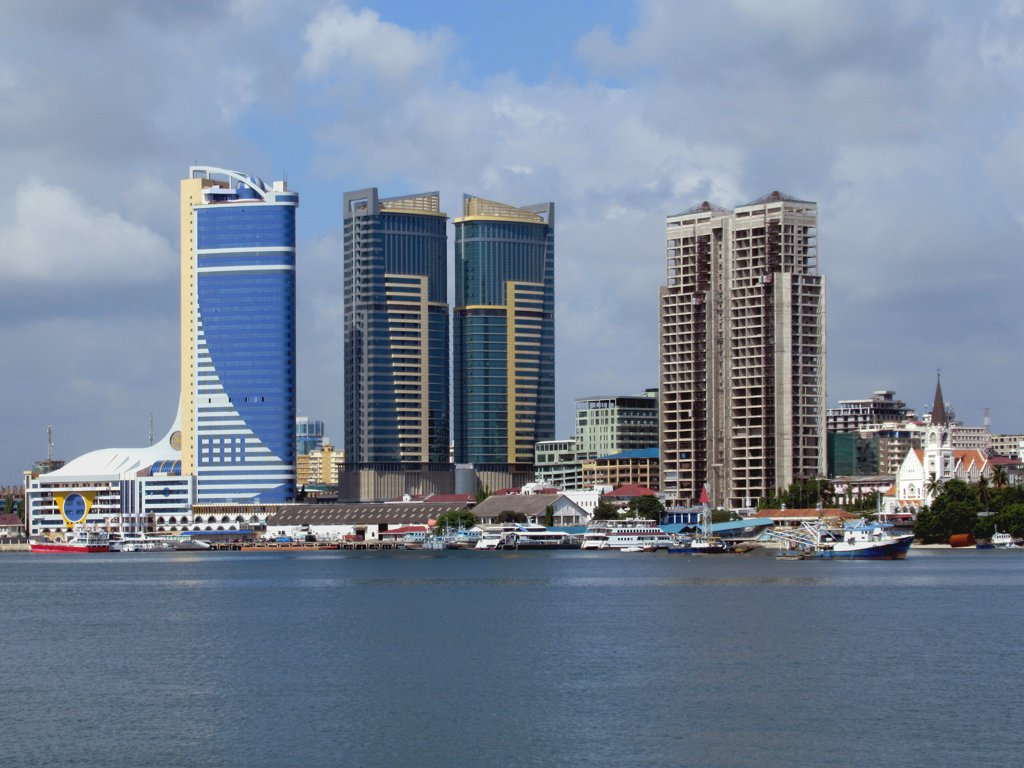
The MNF Building - MNF Square

== The foundation today ==
Over the years, the MNF has operated under the stewardship of a distinguished board comprising prominent figures within Tanzanian society. Initially led by President Julius Kambarage Nyerere, with Joseph Butiku (Principal Private Secretary and later Chief of Staff under Presidents Nyerere and Ali Hassan Mwinyi respectively) serving as the Executive Director. The board has included esteemed personalities such as Salim Ahmed Salim, Judge Warioba, Gertrude Mongella and Nimrod Mkono- making substantial contributions to the foundation's work. Presently, Joseph Butiku serves as Chairperson and Emily Kariuki took over as Executive Director of the Foundation in 2025. Despite the backgrounds of its board members, the MNF maintains a commitment to impartiality.

== Some of the interventions by MNF ==
=== Work at the national level in Tanzania ===
The MNF has been actively engaged at the national level in Tanzania, focusing on empowering individuals and communities through its initiatives. One of its notable programs is the National Development Dialogue, a platform that seeks to deepen people’s understanding of people-centred development. Dialogue covers a wide range of critical issues, including poverty alleviation, education enhancement, healthcare accessibility, promotion of civil society engagement, strategies for scientific and technological development, gender equality initiatives, preservation of cultural heritage, agricultural development with a focus on food security in rural Tanzania, understanding democracy and the rule of law, and economic growth and the evolving international relations shaping the New World Order.

=== Collaboration with UN and AU agencies ===
The MNF has forged partnerships with key international bodies such as the United Nations (UN) and the African Union (AU) to address governance challenges. The foundation has worked closely with the UN Department of Economic and Social Affairs on governance consolidation. In collaboration with the UN and AU from 2002 to 2006, the MNF played a pivotal role in establishing the International Conference on the Great Lakes Region (ICGLR) to address peace, security, and development issues in countries like the Democratic Republic of Congo (DRC), Rwanda, and Burundi. Noteworthy outcomes include the Dar es Salaam Declaration (2004) and the Pact on Security, Stability, and Development (2006) which laid down policy guidelines for signatory governments under the ICGLR framework.

=== Contribution to non-aligned movement ===
The foundation actively promotes the ideals of Mwalimu Nyerere, including concepts like "The Trade Union of the Poor," "Developing Tasks of Non-Alignment," and Third World Unity. These ideals form the cornerstone of the foundation's work and are based on Mwalimu Nyerere's notable writings, such as “The South Commission Report - the Challenge of the South”, "Freedom, Non-Alignment, and South-South Cooperation." In another significant work titled "Freedom and A New World Economic Order," Mwalimu Nyerere presents compelling ideas regarding South-South cooperation, North-South relations, and a proposed agenda for reforming the prevailing international economic order to ensure a more equitable distribution of resources.

=== Supporting liberation movements in Africa ===
Mwalimu Nyerere was a staunch advocate for the creation of the OAU Liberation Committee, advocating for its headquarters to be based in Dar es Salaam rather than Zaire (now the DRC). The committee played a pivotal role as a facilitator in the guerilla warfare conducted by liberation movements, which culminated in defeating colonialists and dismantling the apartheid regime in South Africa. Mwalimu's leadership as the Chairman of Frontline States successfully led a diplomatic campaign that isolated apartheid South Africa from the international community. This collective effort bore fruit in 1994 when South Africa transitioned to a free and democratic independent state, with Nelson Mandela assuming the presidency through democratic election.

=== Establishment of the South Commission ===
Mwalimu Nyerere made substantial contributions to addressing Third World challenges that arose from the tensions between the Global South and North during the crisis-ridden 1980s. He put forth numerous ideas to navigate these challenges, leading to the establishment of the South Commission in 1989. This significant endeavour is detailed in the South Commission's report, wherein terms of reference were prepared under key areas such as analysing national development experiences vis-à-vis future visions, evaluating the global environment, examining South-South cooperation for collective self-reliance, and assessing South-North relations. The Commission delved into critical issues within each thematic area, conducting analyses and offering recommendations for addressing these challenges.

The MNF is set to do in Tanzania and Africa, what the South Commission works to do for the South.

=== Supporting peace and security dialogues ===
The MNF has actively engaged in enhancing peace and security dialogues, exemplified by its collaboration with the Ugandan government in 2000 under the theme of "Consolidating Regional Solidarity," aimed at reviewing the security and development landscape in the region. Additionally, the foundation played a vital role as a legal entity supporting facilitators during the Burundi Peace Process, managing final records, addressing administrative matters, and overseeing program finances.

=== Cultural heritage ===
The MNF is dedicated to collecting, preserving, and recording cultural heritage. By documenting, digitising historical materials, including books, letters, manuscripts, audio recordings, and videos, the Foundation works to ensure that this cultural heritage remains accessible for future generations. The foundation aims to safeguard these invaluable sources of history.

== The MNF Building and an Endowment Fund ==
The MNF Building is the cornerstone of the MNF Endowment Fund. As one of the tallest structures in Dar es Salaam, this notable building was developed as a Build-Operate-Transfer project by a Chinese state-owned company, with financing from the IFC, part of the World Bank. The building is currently leased to the 5-star Rotana hotel, with MNF managing four floors until full ownership is transferred back to them.

On the 7th floor, MNF operates its main offices, a training institute and a small library and heritage centre with an exposition hall. MNF additionally holds valuable property in Dodoma, where it is working to establish a Leadership University. This initiative aims to nurture a new generation of high-caliber leaders equipped to shape Africa’s future.

The goal of the Endowment Fund is to provide MNF with the financial autonomy and independence necessary to fulfill its mission.
