= Maata Näkyvissä Festival =

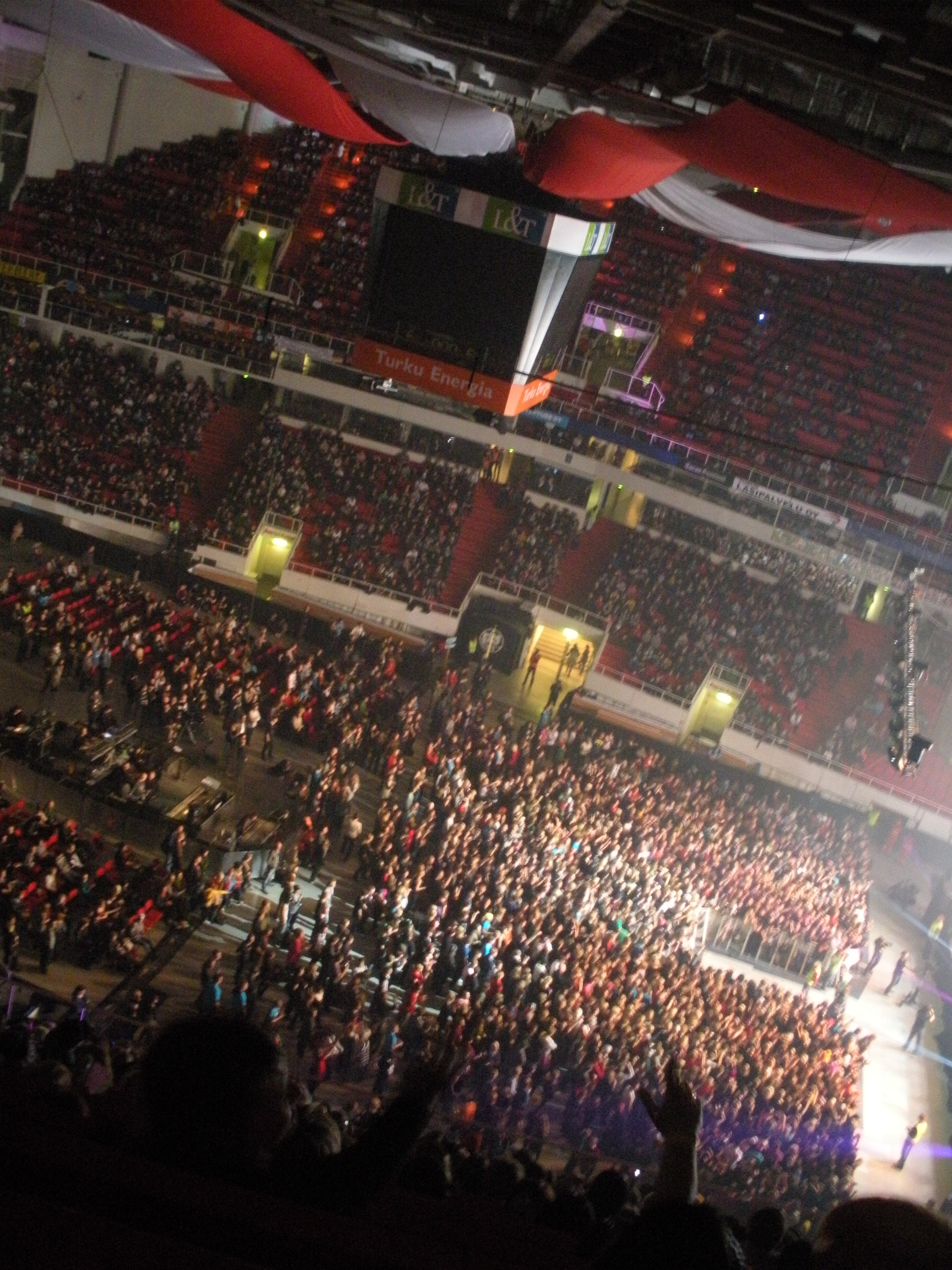
Maata näkyvissä Festival 2009

Maata Näkyvissä Festival (Land Ahoy) is the biggest Christian music event in the Nordic countries. It takes place in Turku, Finland, the venue being HK Arena (previously known as Turkuhalli) and the Turku Fair Centre. The organizers of the event are the Lutheran Evangelical Association of Finland and the Evangelical Lutheran parishes of Turku. The festival lasts from Friday to Sunday, and takes place in the latter half of November every year.

== History ==
On September 19, 1984, 17-year-old Timo Vainio died from a heart attack during his school day. A memorial event was held a year later, in November 1985 in Pallivaha church in Turku with theme Maata Näkyvissä (Land Ahoy). In the event there were about 120 young people who decided to organize the event again next year. The event became the Maata Näkyvissä festival.

In 2009, the event attracted nationwide attention in Finland due to swine influenza (H1N1) epidemic which was feared to spread dramatically in the festival. The topic was raised in Kotimaa magazine by physician Jane Marttila who was in charge of communicable diseases.

Festival and event venues, themes and numbers of participants in the main concert in different years:

1. 1985 Pallivaha church and parish hall, Land Ahoy, about 120
2. 1986 Pallivaha church and parish hall, Which country, which currency,, about 300
3. 1987 Pallivaha church and parish hall, Direct connection, about 600
4. 1988 Luther Church and various schools, In the shade of the paradise tree, about 1 000
5. 1989 VFD house and Kupittaa sports hall, Adventure into the blue, about 2 000
6. 1990 Ikituuri Arena, Michael's Church and Turku Concert Hall, Unheard of
7. 1991 Turkuhalli and Turku Fair Centre, Baby, do not be afraid
8. 1992 Turkuhalli and Turku Fair Centre, Hey, how about?, about 4 500
9. 1993 Turkuhalli and Turku Fair Centre, aD 1993
10. 1994 Turkuhalli and Turku Fair Centre, 10th anniversary
11. 1995 Turkuhalli and Turku Fair Centre, Where are you going?; the last year with actual theme (there have been also less essential themes later)
12. 1996 Turkuhalli and Turku Fair Centre
13. 1997 Turkuhalli and Turku Fair Centre
14. 1998 Turkuhalli and Turku Fair Centre, about 7 000
15. 1999 Turkuhalli and Turku Fair Centre
16. 2000 Turkuhalli and Turku Fair Centre, over 10 000
17. 2001 Turkuhalli and Turku Fair Centre, over 10 000
18. 2002 Turkuhalli and Turku Fair Centre, over 10 000
19. 2003 Turkuhalli and Turku Fair Centre, over 11 000
20. 2004 Turkuhalli and Turku Fair Centre, over 11 000
21. 2005 Turkuhalli and Turku Fair Centre, over 11 000
22. 2006 Turkuhalli and Turku Fair Centre, about 11 500, sold out.
23. 2007 Turkuhalli and Turku Fair Centre, about 11 500, sold out.
24. 2008 Turkuhalli and Turku Fair Centre, about 11 500, almost sold out.
25. 2009 Turkuhalli and Turun Fair Centre, A wonderful day, about 10 000
26. 2010 Turkuhalli and Turku Fair Centre, I love you, nearly 10 000
27. 2011 HK Arena and Turun Fair Centre, "Immortality", over 11 000
28. 2012 HK Arena and Turun Fair Centre, "The family of God"
29. 2014 HK Arena and Turun Fair Centre, Festival's 30th birthday, over 12 000
