= Silver Stream =

River in Otago, New Zealand

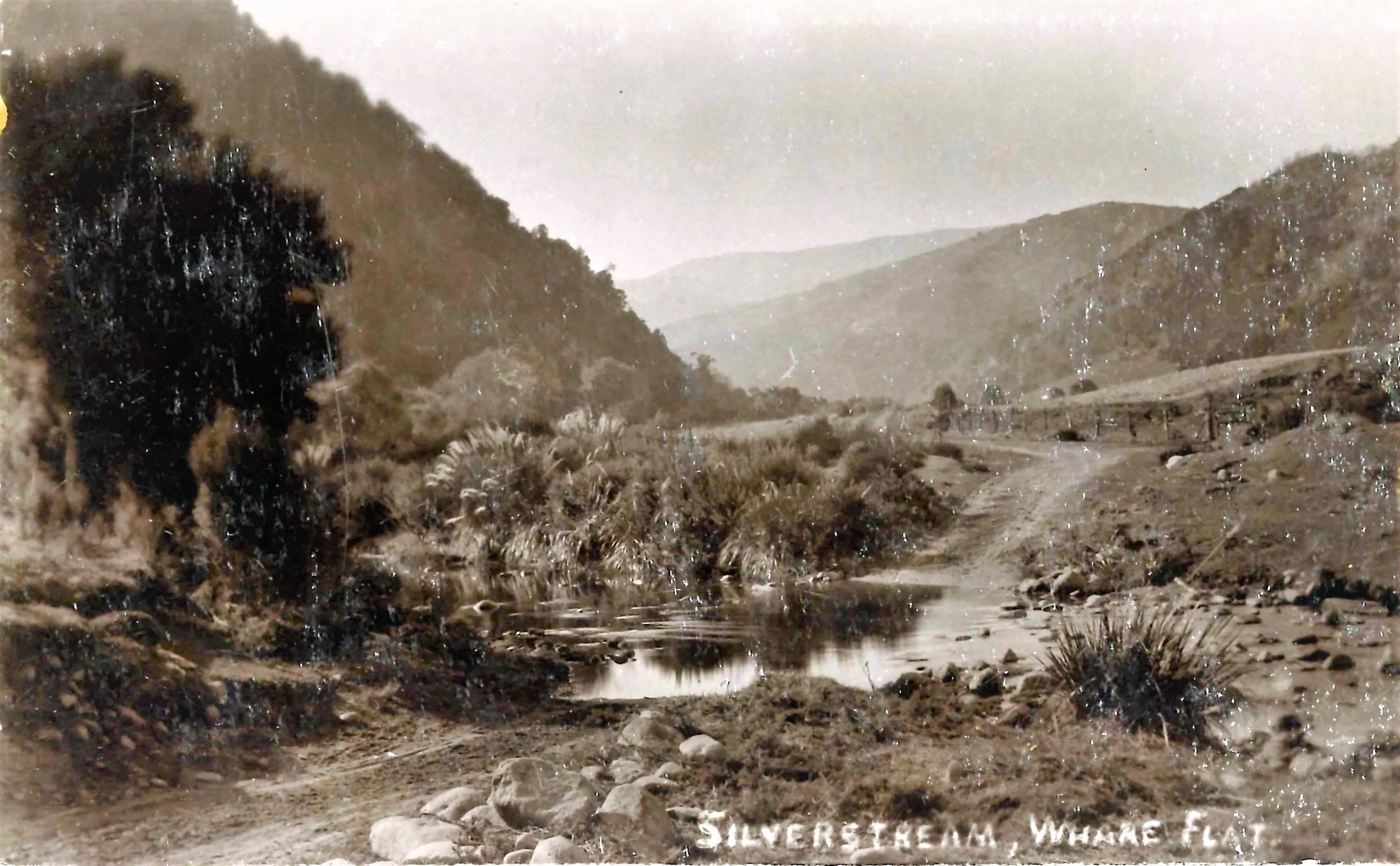
- Silver Stream River at Whare Flat.
- Route of the Silver Stream
- Mouth of Silver Stream Silver Stream (South Island)
- Native name: Whakaehu (Māori)

Location
- Country: New Zealand
- region: Otago
- District: Dunedin

Physical characteristics
- Source: Silverpeaks
- Mouth: Taieri River
  - location: 2 kilometres (1.2 mi) north of Allanton
  - coordinates: 45.889661°S 170.269486°E
- Length: 24 kilometres (15 mi)
- Discharge
  - average: 0.3 cumecs
  - maximum: 130 cumecs

Basin features
- River system: Taieri River

The Silver Stream (Māori: Whakaehu) (sometimes written Silverstream) is a small river flowing close to the town of Mosgiel in Otago, New Zealand.

The Silver Stream rises in the Silverpeaks hills north of Dunedin, on the southern slope of Silver Peak itself, and flows initially southwards through a steep-sided forested valley which widens to become Whare Flat, before turning west at the eastern edge of the Taieri Plains at the foot of Three Mile Hill, close to Invermay Research Station. It continues in a southwesterly direction past the northern edge of Mosgiel, reaching the Taieri River two kilometres north of Allanton. Its total length is about 30 kilometres (19 mi).

Silver Stream is the site of a historic water race. The Silver Stream Water Race was built between 1877 and 1881, and consisted of nearly 30 kilometres (19 mi) of open races, sluices, tunnels, and weirs. The race began at a weir high on the river and traversed the sides of Swampy Summit and Flagstaff before emptying into a reservoir in Kaikorai Valley. Despite efforts to improve the race with the installation of a pump in 1920, it was not successful; problems with subsidence led to much of the race being enclosed in pipe, and the race was finally abandoned in the 1960s.

The river's flow is generally small (at below one cumec), but it has a history of flooding. This has been largely remedied by the artificial raising of its banks, especially close to Mosgiel. In mid-2006, after heavy rain, the Silver Stream flooded at some points, but did not flood on the part of the bank running close to the town.

Several walking routes are located close to or in the valley of the Silver Stream, most of which are aimed at more experienced trampers.

Silverstream School and Silverstream Drive in Mosgiel are named for the river.
