= Jesús Hernández (footballer, born October 2001) =

Venezuelan footballer

Personal information
- Full name: Jesús Gerardo Hernández Castellar
- Date of birth: 5 October 2001 (age 25)
- Place of birth: Venezuela
- Position: Midfielder

Youth career
- Monagas

Senior career*
Years	Team	Apps	(Gls)
2018–2021	Monagas	10	(0)
2021–2022	Atlético La Cruz		
2023–202?	Bolívar SC		
- * Club domestic league appearances and goals as of 21:47, 6 March 2021 (UTC)

Jesús Gerardo Hernández Castellar (born 5 October 2001) is a Venezuelan footballer who plays as a midfielder.

== Career ==
=== Club career ===
Hernández is a product of Monagas. He got his professional debut for the club at the age of 17, on 21 October 2018, against Metropolitanos.
