= Whare Flat =

Locality in Otago Region, New Zealand

- Rural locality
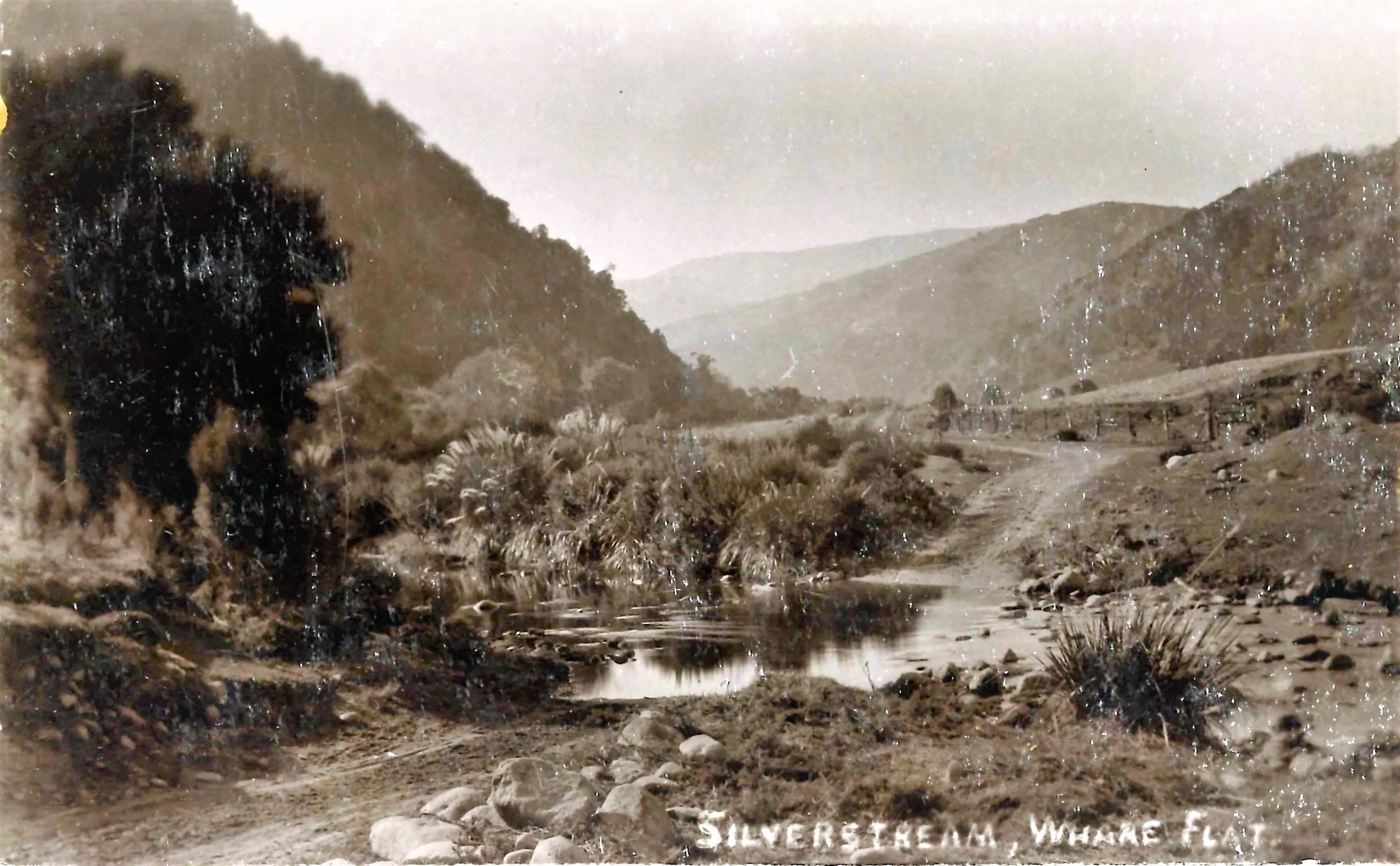
- Silverstream Whare Flat postcard
- Interactive map of Whare Flat
- Coordinates: 45°49′00″S 170°24′30″E
- Country: New Zealand
- Island: South Island
- Region: Otago
- Territorial authority: Dunedin
- Community board: Mosgiel-Taieri Community Board
- Electorates: Taieri; Te Tai Tonga (Māori)

Government
  - Territorial authority: Dunedin City Council
  - Regional council: Otago Regional Council
  - Mayor of Dunedin: Sophie Barker
  - Taieri MP: Ingrid Leary
  - Te Tai Tonga MP: Tākuta Ferris
- Time zone: UTC+12 (NZST)
  - Summer (DST): UTC+13 (NZDT)
- Postcode: 9092
- Area code: 03
- Local iwi: Ngāi Tahu

Whare Flat is a locality some 15 km to the northwest of Dunedin city centre, in the South Island of New Zealand. It is located at a widening of the Silver Stream's valley amid the foothills of the Silverpeaks.

Whare Flat is the location of a scout camp, Camp Waiora, and plays host annually to the Whare Flat Folk Festival, the southern South Island's biggest annual folk music event, which is held over the New Year holiday.

The "whare" of Whare Flat's name was not a traditional Māori structure, but was actually a shepherd's hut.

== Demographics ==
Whare Flat is part of the Taieri statistical area, which covers 150.05 km^{2} (57.93 sq mi) to the west, north and northeast of Mosgiel. The statistical area had an estimated population of 1,610 as of June 2025, with a population density of 11 people per km^{2}.

Historical population for Taieri statistical area
| Year | Pop. | ±% p.a. |
|---|---|---|
| 2006 | 1,170 | — |
| 2013 | 1,410 | +2.70% |
| 2018 | 1,506 | +1.33% |

Before the 2023 census, Taieri had a larger boundary, covering 150.19 km^{2} (57.99 sq mi). Using that boundary, Taieri had a population of 1,506 at the 2018 New Zealand census, an increase of 96 people (6.8%) since the 2013 census, and an increase of 336 people (28.7%) since the 2006 census. There were 546 households, comprising 750 males and 756 females, giving a sex ratio of 0.99 males per female. The median age was 46.9 years (compared with 37.4 years nationally), with 276 people (18.3%) aged under 15 years, 204 (13.5%) aged 15 to 29, 729 (48.4%) aged 30 to 64, and 294 (19.5%) aged 65 or older.

Ethnicities were 95.6% European/Pākehā, 5.4% Māori, 1.2% Pasifika, 1.2% Asian, and 2.4% other ethnicities. People may identify with more than one ethnicity.

The percentage of people born overseas was 11.2, compared with 27.1% nationally.

Although some people chose not to answer the census's question about religious affiliation, 53.2% had no religion, 38.0% were Christian, 0.4% were Muslim, 0.2% were Buddhist and 1.2% had other religions.

Of those at least 15 years old, 282 (22.9%) people had a bachelor's or higher degree, and 216 (17.6%) people had no formal qualifications. The median income was $38,000, compared with $31,800 nationally. 321 people (26.1%) earned over $70,000 compared to 17.2% nationally. The employment status of those at least 15 was that 627 (51.0%) people were employed full-time, 243 (19.8%) were part-time, and 24 (2.0%) were unemployed.
