= Parbėg laivelis =

Parbėg laivelis is an international folk festival in Klaipėda, Lithuania. The festival is held once every two years, in June or July. Its name Parbėg laivelis could be translated as Little ship is coming back.

== 2006 edition ==
Parbėg laivelis 2006 took place between 2006 July-9. Events were organized by Klaipėda city municipality Center of ethnologic culture.

=== Participants ===
- "De Boezeroenen" (Belgium) managers Monique Aerts, Wouter Vanderbiesen,
- "Terra del Sole" (Italy) manager Torre Felice,
- "Pindos" (Greece) manager Konstandinos Barboutis,
- "Liptov" (Slovakia) manager Igor Littva,
- "Bozhychi" (Ukraine) manager Illya Fetysov,
- "Raygorodok" (Ukraine) manager Susana Karpenko,
- "Samborowe Dzieci" (Poland) managers Ewa Litwinska, Krystyna Karczmarska,
- "Hitano" (Poland) manager Iwona Hellwig,
- "Vilnelė" (Vilnius, Lithuania) manager Laima Purlienė,
- "Verpeta" (Kaišiadorys, Lithuania) manager Valerija Jankauskienė,
- "Nalšia" (Vilnius) manager Audronė Vakarinienė,
- "Kupolė" (Kaunas, Lithuania) manager Antanas Bernatonis,
- "Raskila" (Panevėžys, Lithuania) manager Lina Vilienė,
- "Insula" (Vilnius) manager Milda Ričkutė,
- "Sedula" (Šiauliai, Lithuania) manager Virginija Vintilaitė,
- "Mėguva" (Palanga, Lithuania) manager Zita Baniulaitytė,
- "Giedružė" (Nida, Lithuania) manager Audronė Burinskienė,
- "Duja" (Vilnius) manager Arūnas Lunys,
- "Lipk ant sienų" (Kaunas) managers Artūras Sinkevičius, Paulius Baronas,
- Folkloro teatras "Aitvaras" (Klaipėda, Lithuania) manager Jonas Kavaliauskas,
- "Alka" (Klaipėda),
- "Kuršių ainiai" (Klaipėda) managers Jolita Vozgirdienė, Alvydas Vozgirdas,
- "Senoliai" (Klaipėda) managers Elena Šalkauskienė, Jonas Petrauskas,
- "Šeimyna" (Klaipėda) manager Danutė Krakauskienė,
- "Žemaičių alkierius" (Klaipėda) manager Janina Zvonkuvienė, Vida Čepulienė,
- Karinis jūrų pajėgų pučiamųjų orkestras (Klaipėda) manager Pranas Memėnas

== 2008 edition ==
Parbėg laivelis 2008 was held on July 10–13.

== 2012 edition ==
The 2012 edition was held on July 12–15.
