= Jesús Sanoja Hernández =

Jesús Sanoja Hernández (Tumeremo, Bolívar state 27 June 1930 - Caracas, 9 June 2007), was a Venezuelan journalist, historian and writer, who authored Entre golpes y revoluciones (2007).

== Works ==
- Entre golpes y revoluciones (2007).
