= Holiday Folk Fair =

Cultural event in Wisconsin, United States

Coordinates: 43.018052°N 88.014339°W

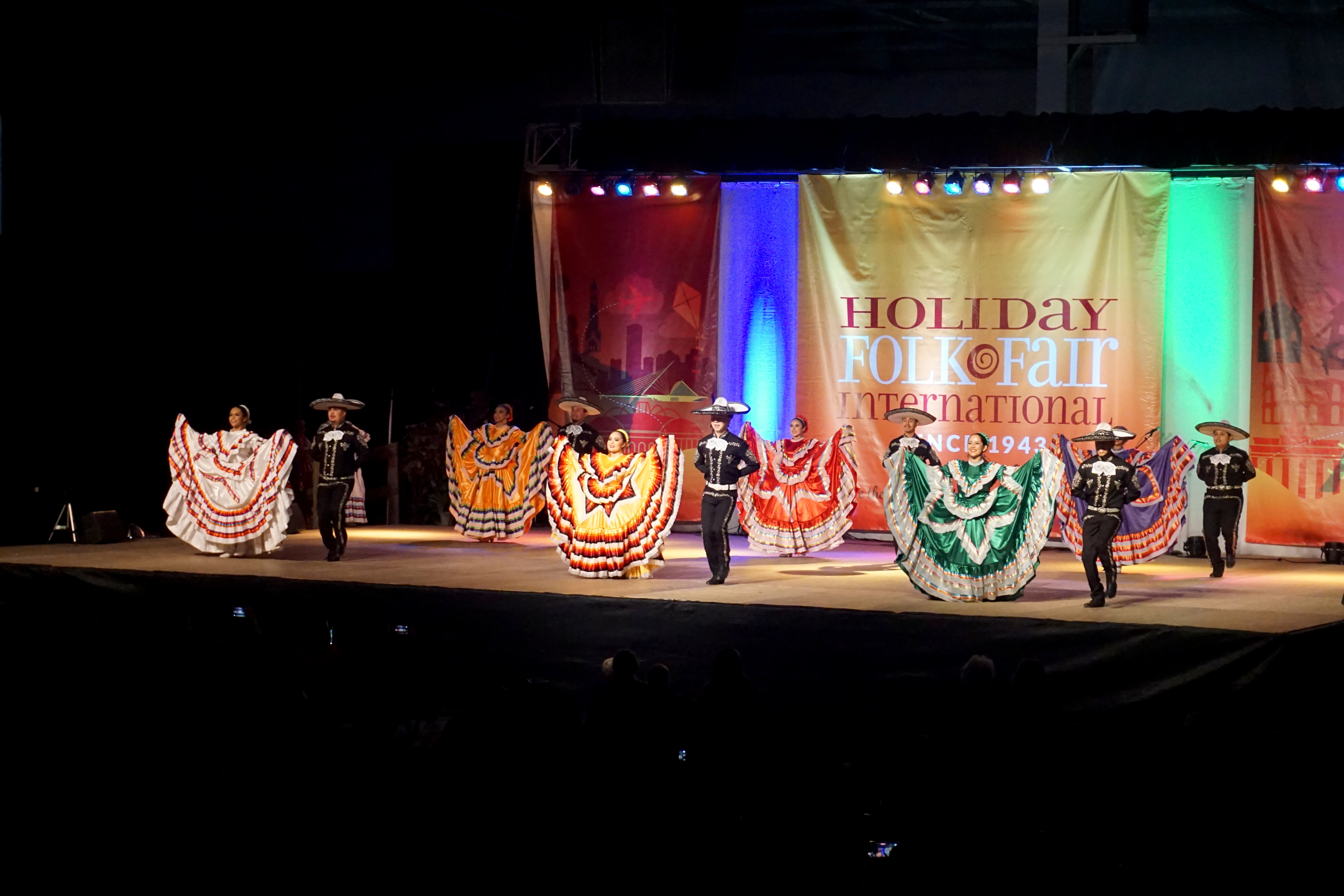
Mexican dance performance at the 2025 Holiday Folk Fair International

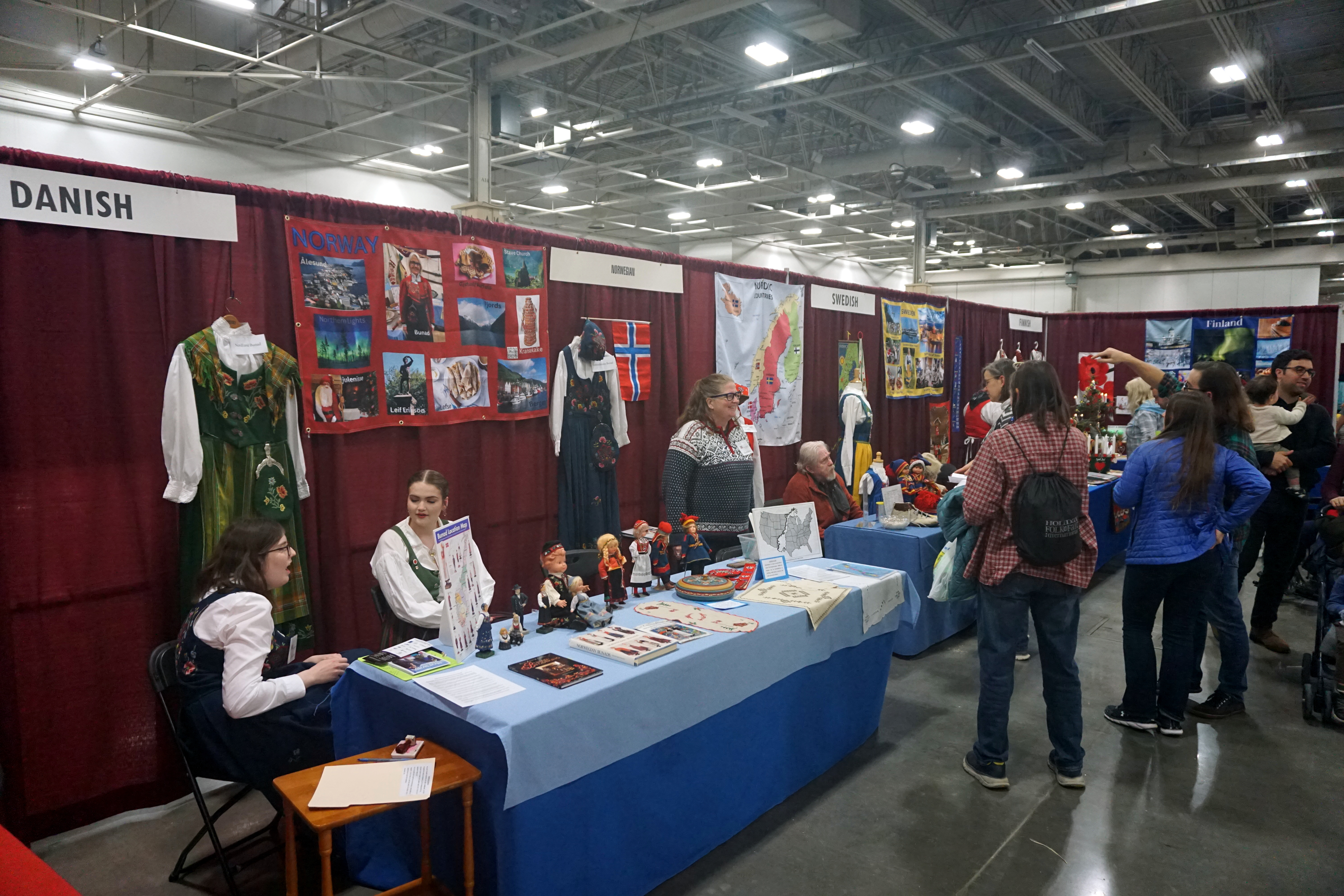
Heritage Lane at the 2023 Holiday Folk Fair International

The Holiday Folk Fair is an annual three-day festival celebrating cultures from around the world. Thousands of visitors attend the Fair each year. It is held the weekend before Thanksgiving in West Allis, Wisconsin, at the Wisconsin Exposition Center of Wisconsin State Fair Park. It is billed as the largest indoor international festival in America. The Fair is sponsored and organized by the International Institute of Wisconsin, a not-for-profit social service agency that promotes cultural understanding. Al Durtka is its current president.

The Fair offers entertainment, worldwide food, art displays, vendors, and demonstrations. An example of such food could be egg rolls, strudel, scones, falafel, pizzelle, sushi. The main entertainment takes place on two floors, the All Nations Theater and the Music Pavilion. Dancers representing over 30 nations perform for the crowds.

== History ==
The first Holiday Folk Fair was held on December 10, 1944. Despite a violent snowstorm, 3,500 people showed up and took part in the event. In 1947 the Fair became a two-day event, and Friday evenings were added in 1964. The Fair was formerly held at what's now the UW-Milwaukee Panther Arena. It was also hosted at the Henry Maier Festival Park for one year, before being located to the Wisconsin State Fair Park.
