= Sonia Sanoja =

Venezuelan choreographer

- Born: 2 April 1932; Caracas, Venezuela
- Died: 26 March 2017 (aged 84); Caracas, Venezuela
- Occupations: Dancer, teacher, choreographer, poet
- Spouse: Alfredo Silva Estrada
- Awards: National Dance Award (1998)

Sonia Sanoja (2 April 1932 – 26 March 2017) was a Venezuelan dancer, teacher, choreographer, and poet, a pioneer of her country's dance scene in the 1950s and 60s, particularly in the area of contemporary dance.

== Career ==
Sonia Sanoja was born in Caracas on 2 April 1932. In 1946, she began her studies at the Ballet Chair of the Liceo Andrés Bello. This had been founded a few months earlier by Argentine dancers Hery and Luz Thomson and Irish dancers David and Eva Gray, members of the Ballet Russe of Wassily de Basil who had settled in Venezuela after fleeing post-war Europe.

In 1953, Sanoja entered the Grishka Holguín Dance Theater, where Venezuela's contemporary dance movement began. She subsequently went to study in France. Upon returning to Venezuela in 1961, she and Holguín created the Contemporary Dance Foundation. This was a platform for the development of the nation's nascent contemporary dance scene, and its association with the Museo de Bellas Artes of Caracas aided the process of integration with other arts. In 1971, she founded the Sonia Sanoja Choreographic Art Company. She created the project Contemporary Dance of Venezuela that, together with the Theater of Contemporary Dance, under the direction of Grishka Holguín, presented a diversified vision of contemporary dance and gave rise to the emergence of other experimental alternatives.

She married poet Alfredo Silva Estrada in 1960.

Sanoja studied philosophy at the Central University of Venezuela. She received the National Dance Award in 1998 for her artistic career and contributions to dance in Venezuela.

In 2015, she was the subject of a tribute from Venezuela's National Experimental University of the Arts, as well as a short film titled Lección de Danza. In 2016 she returned to the stage with the project Amor amargo by Venezuelan choreographer Leyson Ponce, a work inspired by La hora menguada by Rómulo Gallegos. There she shared the stage with her great friend Graciela Henríquez, a fellow dancer and innovator.

== Death ==
Sonia Sanoja died in Caracas on 26 March 2017 after a long struggle with cancer.

== Books ==
- 1963: Duraciones visuales
- 1971: A través de la danza
- 1981: Tiempo secreto de Sonia Sanoja, with Miguel Acosta Saignes
- 1992: Bajo el signo de la danza, ISBN 9789800105665
