= Europeade =

Folk festival in Finland

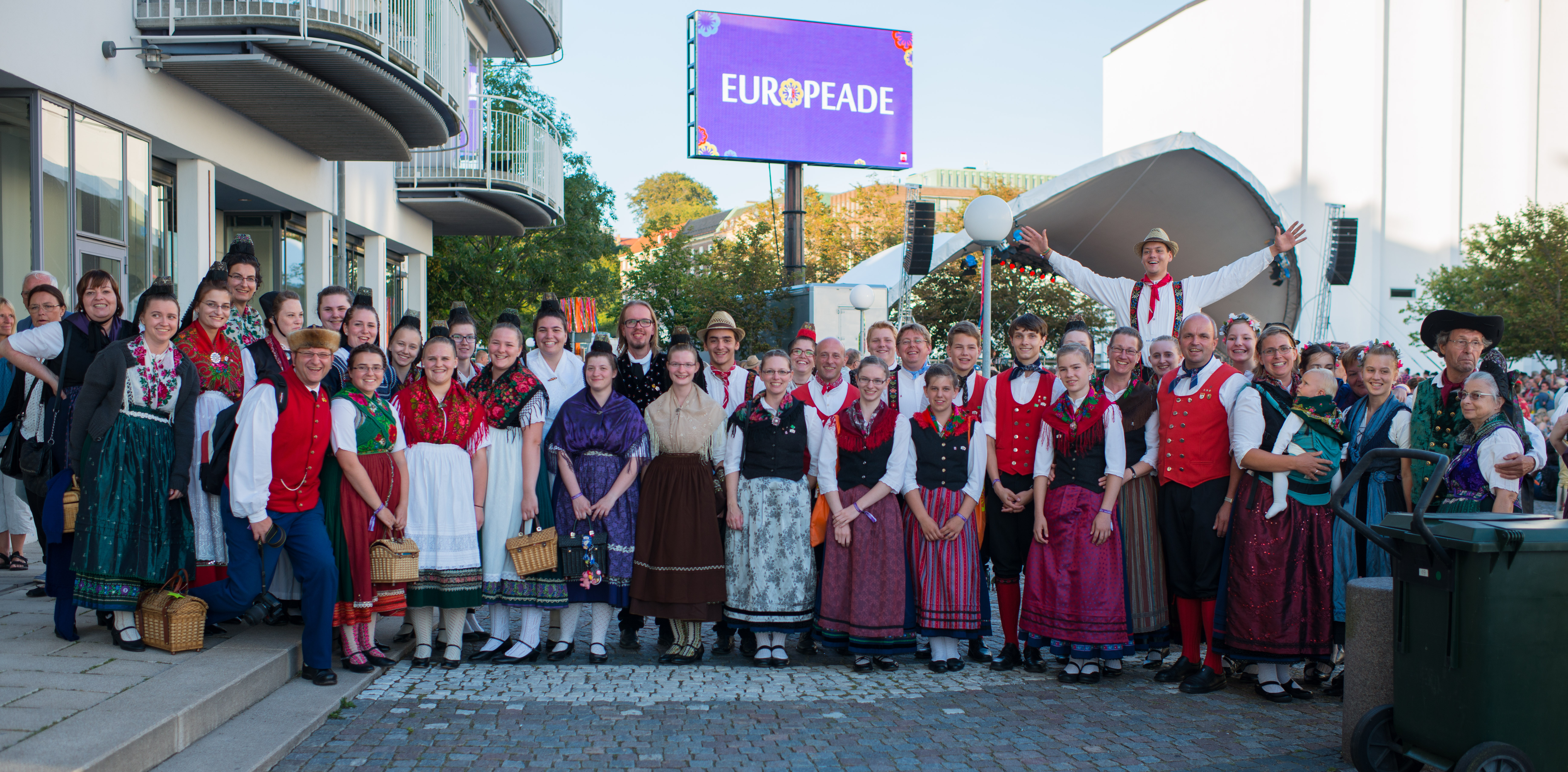
Dancers on the Europeade 2015 in Helsingborg

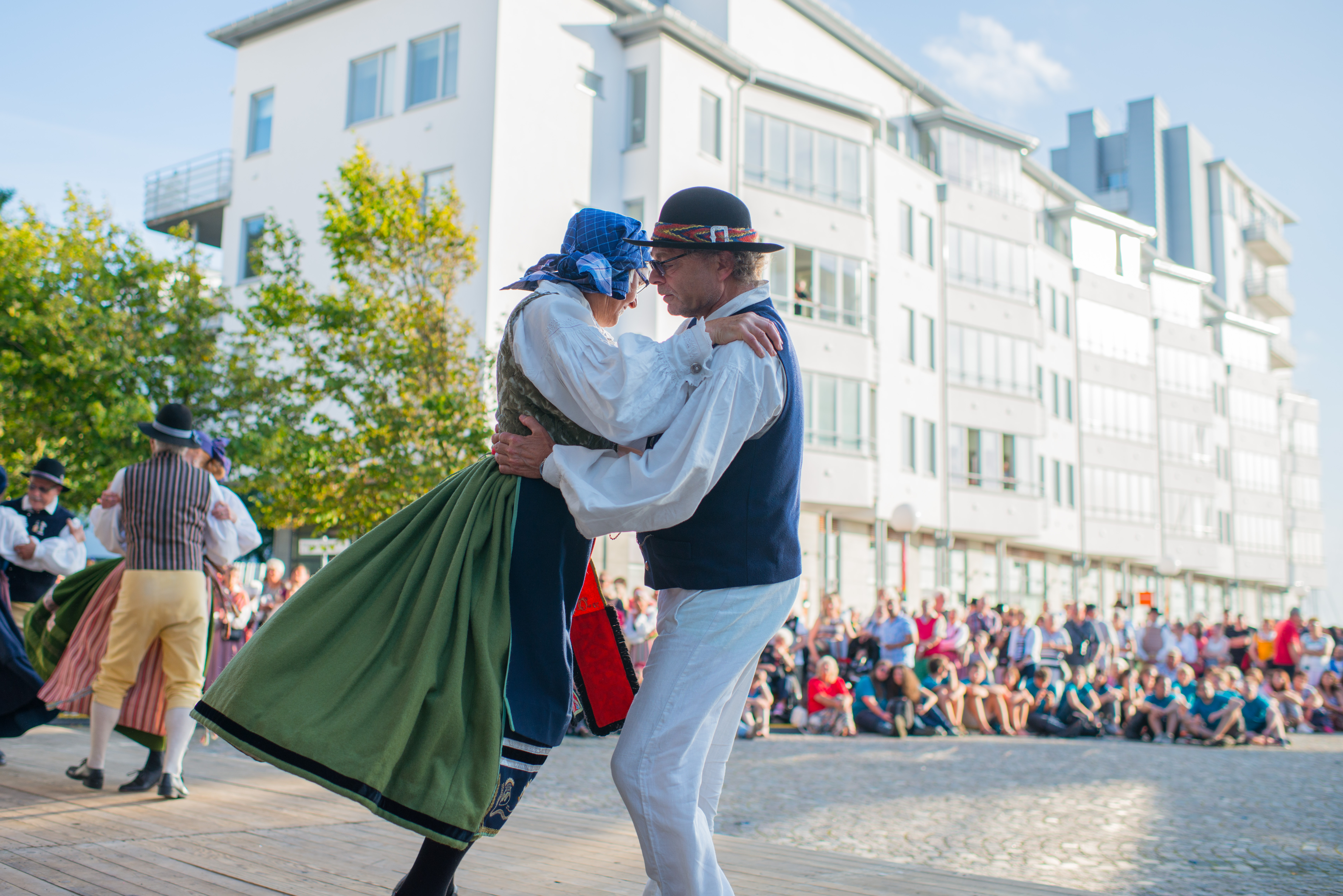
Folkdance at Henry Dunkers Plats in Helsingborg 2015

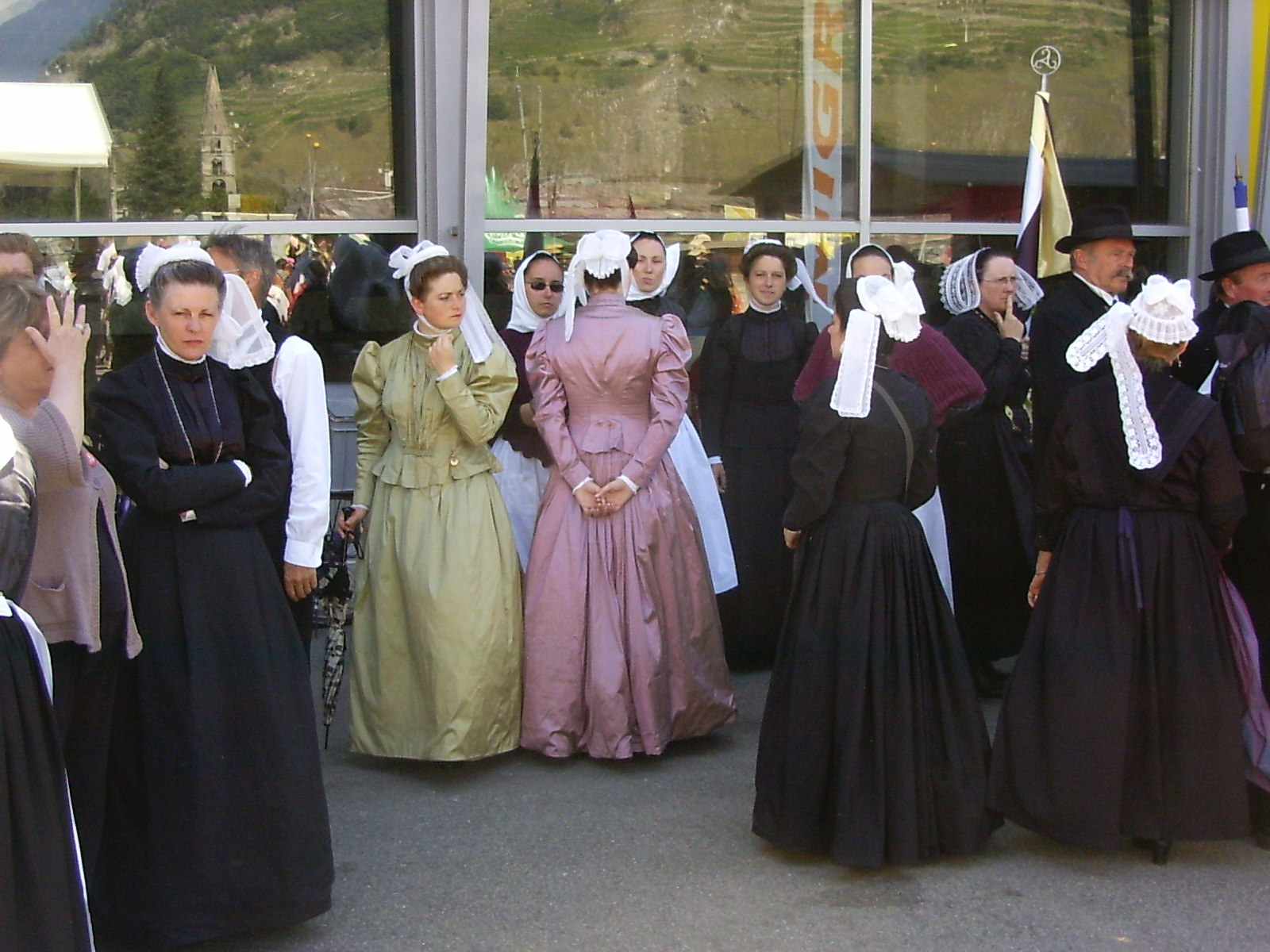
Europeade 2008 at Martigny, Switzerland

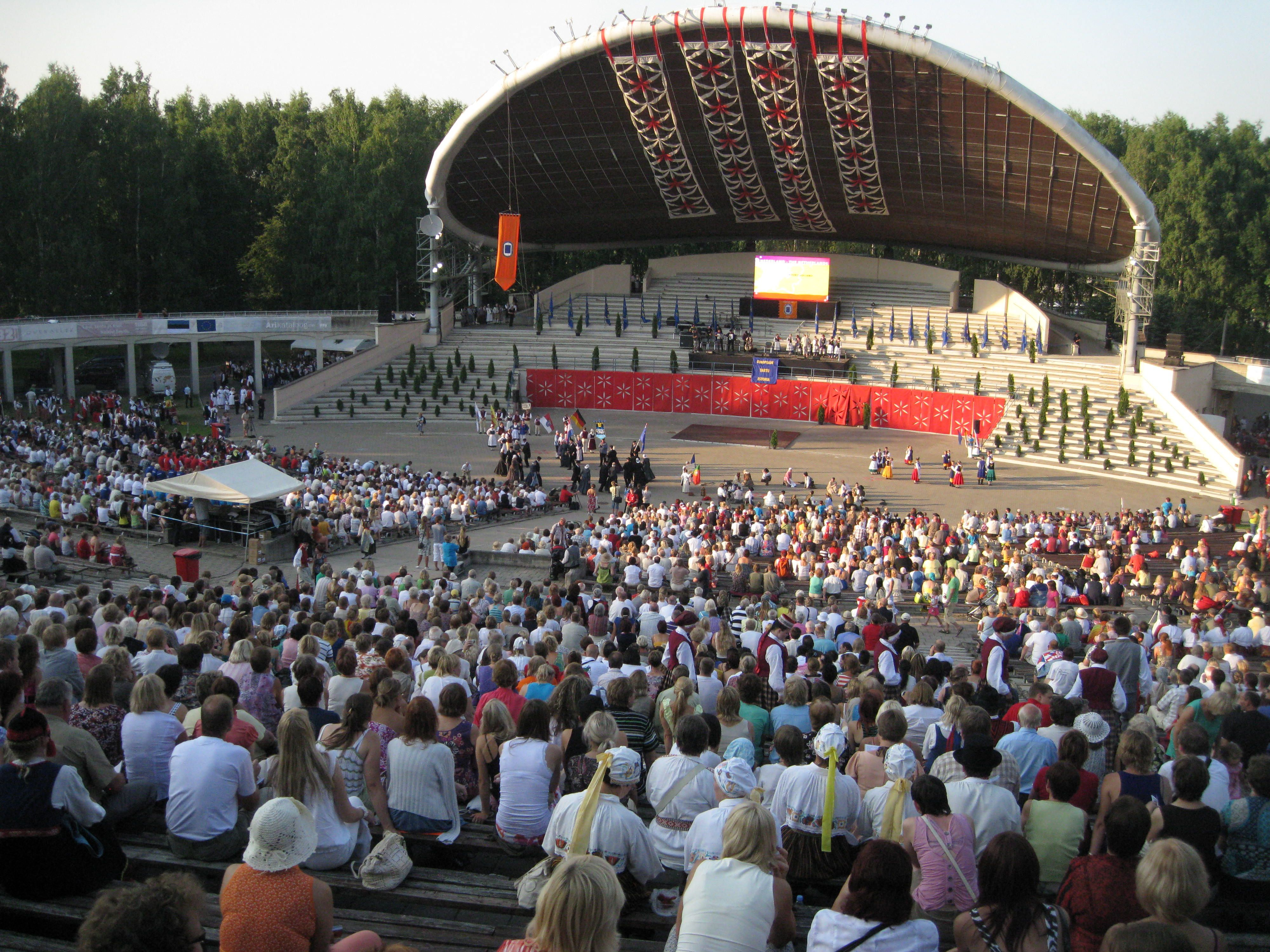
Europeade 2011 event in Tartu festival arena (laululava) in Tartu, Estonia

Europeade is the largest festival of European folk culture, held in a different European country each year. The last Europeade was held in Turku, Finland in 2017. The year before that it was held in Namur, Belgium in 2016.

The first Europeade was held in 1964 at the initiative of Mon de Clopper (1922–1998) from Flanders and Robert Müller-Kox, a German exiled from the Province of Silesia. Mon de Clopper was president of the Europeade until 1997, when he was succeeded by the current president Bruno Peeters (born 1939), also from Flanders.

The goal of the Europeade is to foster a united Europe, where everyone contributes and develops his or her own culture, respecting everyone else. This philosophy is practised each year during the five-day festival, when thousands of people from all parts of Europe, dressed in their traditional costumes, meet to sing, to make music, to dance and to celebrate - without formal lecturing.

In a typical Europeade there are about five thousand participants, all in costume, in almost two hundred groups, from about twenty-two countries. They all pay their own transport costs, and perform free of charge. Participants arrive during the Wednesday, and are accommodated in large premises wherever possible, typically in large schools, with basic beds supplied in the class-rooms, and using other school amenities. Large-scale catering is provided, usually a simple breakfast, a packed lunch and a hot evening meal in one central location. Groups perform in a number of large concerts, in designated street locations, and take part in a massed parade through the town and in a major Saturday evening Europeade Ball. Outside the actual events many groups will sing, play and dance wherever they happen to find themselves, including the premises where they are lodged. After the Sunday afternoon Closing Concert - typically ninety groups performing - groups are free to make their way home, but accommodation continues until after breakfast on the Monday morning.

== Cities where the Europeade was held ==
1. 1964 Antwerp, Belgium
2. 1965 Dortmund, West Germany
3. 1966 Antwerp, Belgium
4. 1967 Valencia, Spain
5. 1968 Antwerp, Belgium
6. 1969 Marche-en-Famenne, Belgium
7. 1970 Herzogenaurach, West Germany
8. 1971 Antwerp, Belgium
9. 1972 Annecy, France
10. 1973 Nuoro, Italy
11. 1974 Antwerp, Belgium
12. 1975 Marbella, Spain
13. 1976 Annecy, France
14. 1977 Nuoro, Italy
15. 1978 Vienna, Austria
16. 1979 Antwerp, Belgium
17. 1980 Schwalmstadt, West Germany
18. 1981 Martigny, Switzerland
19. 1982 Gijón, Spain
20. 1983 Vienna, Austria
21. 1984 Rennes, France
22. 1985 Turin, Italy
23. 1986 Figueira da Foz, Portugal
24. 1987 Munich, West Germany
25. 1988 Antwerp, Belgium
26. 1989 Libourne, France
27. 1990 Valladolid, Spain
28. 1991 Rennes, France
29. 1992 Figueira da Foz, Portugal
30. 1993 Horsens, Denmark
31. 1994 Frankenberg, Germany
32. 1995 Valencia, Spain
33. 1996 Turin, Italy
34. 1997 Martigny, Switzerland
35. 1998 Rennes, France
36. 1999 Bayreuth, Germany
37. 2000 Horsens, Denmark
38. 2001 Zamora, Spain
39. 2002 Antwerp, Belgium
40. 2003 Nuoro, Italy
41. 2004 Riga, Latvia (Note: A monument in Riga commemorates this Europeade. It was donated by cities that hosted the Europeade before, on the occasion of the first Europeade in the Baltic States and in a former Soviet republic. It took place from 21 to 25 July, and it was the first biggest and most significant cultural event since the state of Latvia joined the European Union, thus becoming a landmark in the history of creating a common cultural environment. More than 4,000 participants from 38 European countries and regions gathered in Riga for one of the largest European folk culture forums.)
42. 2005 Quimper, France
43. 2006 Zamora, Spain
44. 2007 Horsens, Denmark
45. 2008 Martigny, Switzerland
46. 2009 Klaipėda Lithuania
47. 2010 Bolzano, Italy
48. 2011 Tartu, Estonia
49. 2012 Padua, Italy
50. 2013 Gotha, Germany
51. 2014 Kielce, Poland
52. 2015 Helsingborg, Sweden
53. 2016 Namur, Belgium
54. 2017 Turku, Finland
55. 2018 Viseu, Portugal
56. 2019 Frankenberg an der Eder, Germany
57. 2022 Klaipėda, Lithuania
58. 2023 Gotha, Germany
59. 2024 Nuoro, Italy
60. 2025 cancelled

2020 and 2021 were cancelled and held virtually due to Covid-19.

== Participation by country ==
For the Europeade 2008 in Martigny (Switzerland) some two hundred groups registered. Their countries of origin were as follows:

- 27 groups from Germany
- 26 groups from Spain and Belgium
- 16 groups from Latvia
- 15 groups from each Estonia, France and Italy
- 10 groups from Hungary
- 9 groups from Lithuania
- 8 groups from the Czech Republic
- 7 groups from Portugal
- 5 groups from Denmark
- 3 groups from each Ireland, The Netherlands, Romania and Sweden
- two groups from each Bulgaria, Cyprus, Finland, Greece and the United Kingdom
- one group from each Armenia, Austria, Georgia, Greenland and Luxembourg
- also the host country Switzerland was represented by only one group
- there were no groups from Iceland, Norway, Poland, Slovakia and Former Yugoslavia, despite the strong folk tradition of those countries.

For the Europeade 2011 in Tartu (Estonia) over hundred groups registered. Their countries of origin were as follows:

- 34 groups from Estonia
- 21 groups from Latvia
- 13 groups from Finland
- 12 groups from Germany
- 8 groups from each Italy and Belgium
- 5 groups from each Lithuania and Czech Republic
- 3 groups from each Spain, Ireland, Portugal, Sweden and Turkey
- 2 groups from each Slovakia, Cyprus and Denmark
- 1 group from each Austria, Switzerland, France, Greenland, Hungary, Netherlands, Norway, Russia, Slovenia and United Kingdom
- there were no groups from Iceland, Belarus, Poland, Ukraine and Moldova, despite the strong folk tradition of those countries.
