= Interceltic Festival =

Interceltic Festival may refer to:

- Festival Interceltique de Lorient, Brittany, France
- Interceltic Festival of Avilés, Asturias, Spain
- Interceltic Festival of Morrazo, Moaña, Galicia, Spain

== See also ==
- Ortigueira's Festival of Celtic World, Galicia, Spain
