= Luis de la Sierra =

Spanish military history and travel writer

- Born: Luis de la Sierra Fernández; 1920; Santander, Spain
- Died: October 11, 2016 (aged 95–96); Palma de Mallorca, Spain
- Education: Escuela Naval Militar
- Occupations: Historian, writer and military personnel

Luis de la Sierra Fernández (1920 in Santander – 11 October 2014 in Palma de Mallorca) was a Spanish writer, historian and sailor mostly known for his naval military history and travelling books.

== Biography ==
When he was 17 years old, during the Spanish Civil War, he enrolled as a sailor on the National Navy serving in the light cruiser Almirante Cervera. When the war was over, he was accepted in the Escuela Naval Militar (Military Navy School) of San Fernando (Cádiz), where, in 1943, he obtained the rank of alférez de navío (ensign). He specialized in submarine warfare and Torpedoes. During his long career he served in several minelayers, cruisers and the schoolships Galatea and Juan Sebastián Elcano. He finished his military career teaching at the Escuela de Armas Submarinas (Submarine Arms School) until 1982.

His first book was the renowned "Buques suicidas. Historia de los submarinos de bolsillo, torpedos humanos y botes explosivos en el siglo XX" published by the Spanish Navy and winner of a Virgen del Carmen prize in 1963. Its success paved the way for his writing career, mainly made of naval history books, particularly the naval engagements of both world wars, traveling books and guides along with a few translations to Spanish of international authors. During his writing career he frequently moved between Almería, Barcelona, Cádiz, Cartagena, Madrid, Palma de Mallorca and Santander to complete his research.

== Books ==
Most of his books are yet to translated into English, consequently the original title in Spanish has been preserved.

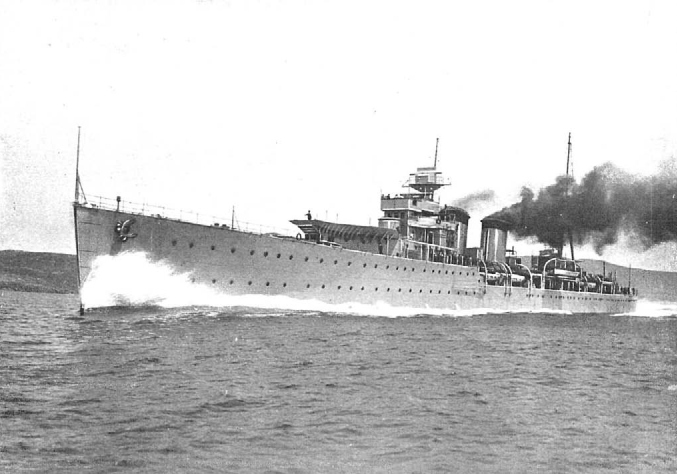
The cruiser Almirante Cervera in 1928.

=== Naval history ===
- Buques suicidas. Historia de los submarinos de bolsillo, torpedos humanos y botes explosivos en el siglo XX. Barcelona, España: Juventud. 1958. ISBN 978-84-261-0022-1.
- Titanes azules. Acciones navales de la segunda guerra mundial. Barcelona, España: Juventud. 1963. ISBN 978-84-261-0727-5.
- Corsarios alemanes en la Segunda Guerra Mundial. Barcelona, España: Juventud. 1969. ISBN 978-84-261-0726-8.
- La guerra naval en el Atlántico (1939–1945). Barcelona, España: Juventud. 1974. ISBN 978-84-261-5715-7.
- La guerra naval en el Mediterráneo (1940–1943). Barcelona, España: Juventud. 1976. ISBN 978-84-261-0264-5.
- La guerra naval en el Pacífico (1940–1943). Barcelona, España: Juventud. 1979. ISBN 978-84-261-1590-4.
- El mar en la Gran Guerra (1914–1918). Barcelona, España: Juventud. 1984. ISBN 978-84-261-2023-6.
- Corsarios alemanes en la gran guerra (1914–1918). Barcelona, España: Juventud. 1985. ISBN 978-84-261-2147-9.

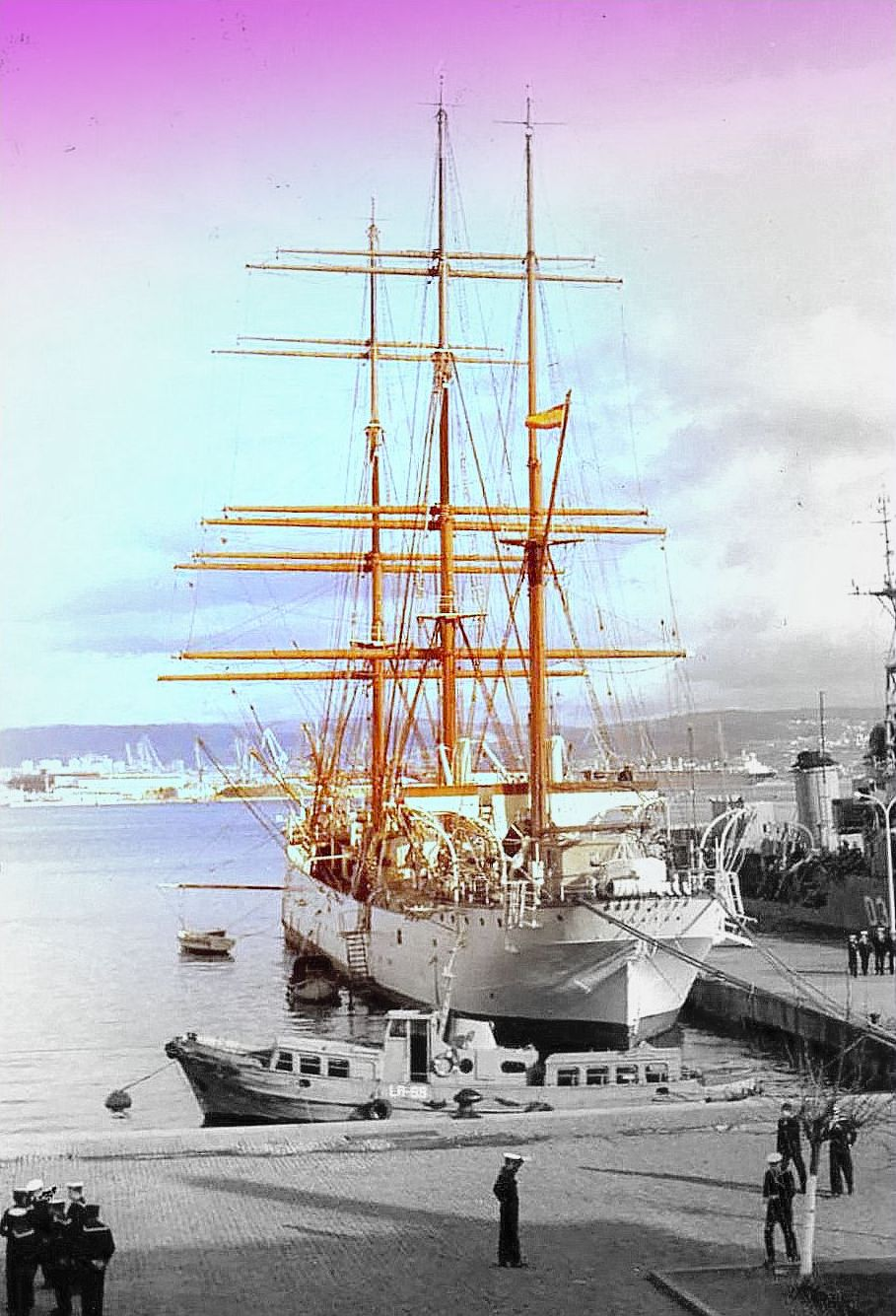
The school ship Galatea in 1975.

=== Travel ===
- Viajes de un marino. Barcelona, España: Juventud. 1981. ISBN 978-84-261-1824-0.
- Viaje a Egipto: doce días en el legendario País del Nilo. Barcelona, España: Ediciones del Serbal. 1990. ISBN 978-84-7628-070-6.
- Viaje a Mesoamérica: por tierras de México, Guatemala y Honduras. Barcelona, España: Ediciones del Serbal. 1991. ISBN 978-84-7628-070-6.
- Viaje a la India. Barcelona, España: Ediciones del Serbal. 1993. ISBN 978-84-7628-121-5.
- Viaje a China. Barcelona, España: Ediciones del Serbal. 1995. ISBN 978-84-7628-134-5.
- Viaje a la Atlántida. Vigo, Pontevedra, España: Ediciones Cardeñoso. 2003. ISBN 978-84-8190-322-5.
- Mis viajes. Vigo, Pontevedra, España: Ediciones Cardeñoso. 2004. ISBN 978-84-8190-363-8.

=== Translations ===
- Müllenheim-Rechberg, Burkard von (1982). El acorazado "Bismarck". Relato de un superviviente. Barcelona, España: Juventud. ISBN 978-84-261-1915-5.
- Heyerdahl, Thor (1972). Expedición. Barcelona, España: Juventud. ISBN 978-84-261-5612-9.
- Heyerdahl, Thor (1973). Las expediciones Ra. Barcelona, España: Juventud. ISBN 978-84-226-0259-0.
- Heyerdahl, Thor (1981). La expedición Tigris. Barcelona, España: Juventud. ISBN 978-84-261-1828-8.
- Slocum, Joshua (1981). Navegando en solitario alrededor del mundo. Barcelona, España: Juventud. ISBN 978-84-261-1718-2.
- Heyerdahl, Thor (1986). El misterio de las Maldivas. Barcelona, España: Juventud. ISBN 978-84-261-2215-5.
- Calhoun, Raymond C. (1986). Tifón, el otro enemigo. Barcelona, España: Juventud. ISBN 978-84-261-2196-7.
- Chichester, Francis (1993). La vuelta al mundo del Gipsy Moth. Barcelona, España: Juventud. ISBN 978-84-261-0744-2.
