= Litos =

Litos is a nickname, and may refer to:

- Litos (footballer, born 1967), Portuguese former football midfielder and coach
- Litos (footballer, born January 1974), Portuguese former football goalkeeper
- Litos (footballer, born February 1974), Portuguese former football defender

Litos is a town, and may refer to:

- Litos, Spanish town in the province of Zamora.

== See also ==
- Lito (disambiguation), given name
