= Lito =

Lito may refer to:

== People ==
- Tyler Lito (born 1985), Canadian film and TV actor
- Lito (Cape Verdean footballer) (born 1975), Cape Verdean footballer
- Lito (footballer) (born 1956), Portuguese footballer
- Lito Vidigal (born 1969), Angolan footballer
- Manuel Costas (footballer, born 1947), Spanish footballer
- Lito Atienza (born 1941), Filipino politician and former mayor of the city of Manila
- Lito Lapid (born 1955), Filipino actor and politician
- Lito Legaspi (1941–2019), Filipino actor
- Lito Pimentel (born 1963), Filipino actor
- Lito Sheppard (born 1981), American football player
- Lito Sisnorio (1982–2007), Filipino boxer who died during a bout
- Lito Sousa (1967–2026), Brazilian aviation specialist and YouTuber
- half of Lito & Polaco, a Puerto Rican hip hop/reggaeton duo

== Other uses ==
- Lupinus toratensis, a species of Lupinus, a genus of flowering plants
- Lito, brand name for Lithium (medication)
- DJI Lito, a series of quadcopter drones manufactured by Chinese company DJI

== See also ==
- Leto (disambiguation)
- Litos (disambiguation)
- Litto (disambiguation)
