= Manuel Costas =

Manuel Costas is the name of:

- Manuel Costas (footballer, born 1942), Spanish footballer
- Manuel Costas (footballer, born 1947), Spanish footballer
- Manuel Costas (politician), Peruvian politician
