= Marín, Pontevedra =

Marín
- Municipality
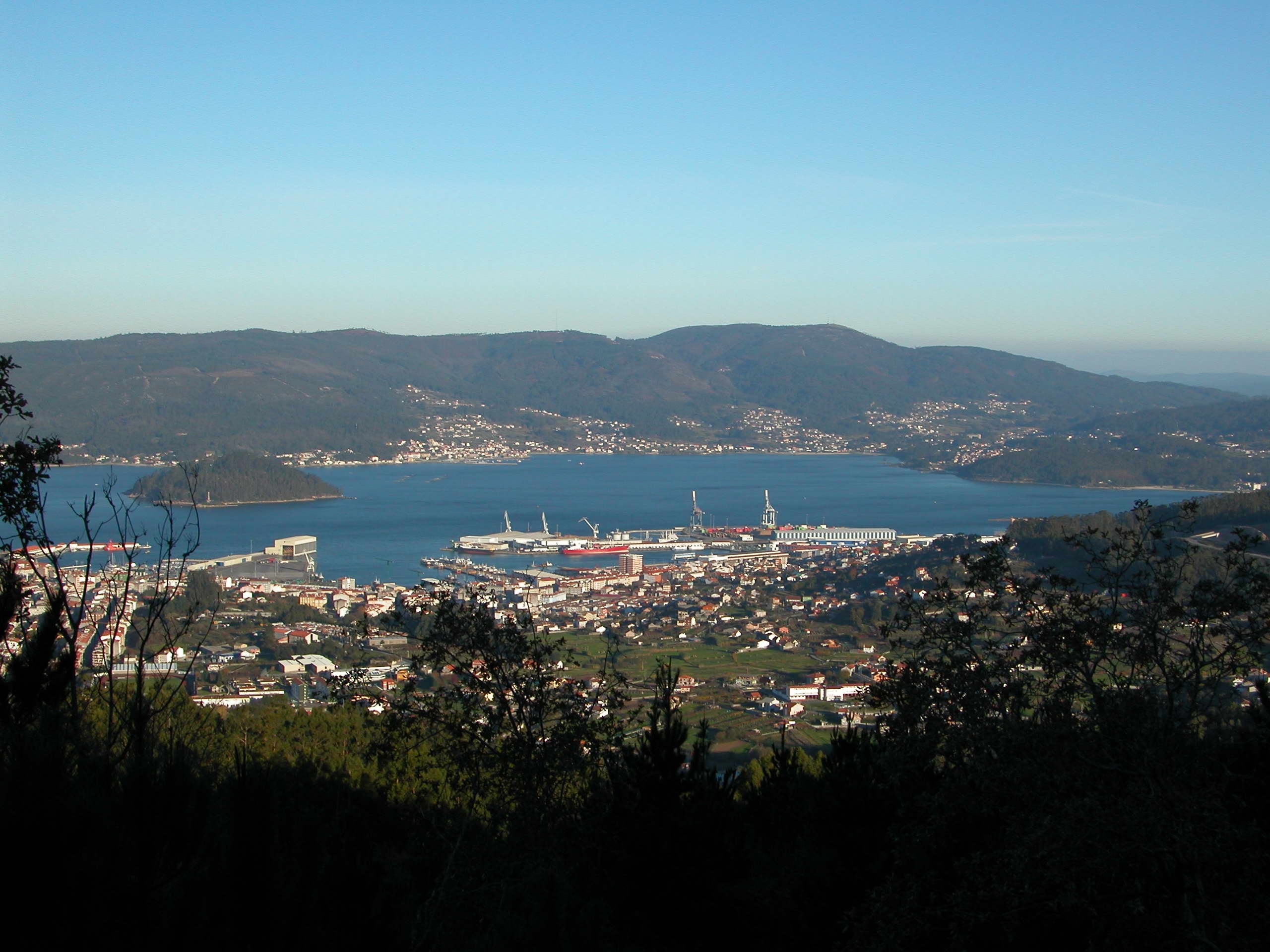

- Flag Coat of arms
- Interactive map of Marín
- Coordinates: 42°23′36″N 8°42′0″W
- Country: Spain
- Autonomous community: Galicia
- Province: Pontevedra
- Comarca: O Morrazo
- Parroquias: Ardán, O Campo, Marín, Mogor, San Tomé de Piñeiro, San Xulián and Seixo

Government
  - Type: Mayor-council government
  - Body: Concello de Marín
  - Alcaldesa (Mayor): María Ramallo Vázquez (PPdeG)

Area
  - Total: 36.83 km^{2} (14.22 sq mi)

Population (2025-01-01)
  - Total: 23,991
  - Density: 651.4/km^{2} (1,687/sq mi)
- Time zone: UTC+1 (CET)
  - Summer (DST): UTC+2 (CEST)
- Website: www.concellodemarin.es

Marín is a town and municipality in Galicia, Spain in the province of Pontevedra. It is located on the southern shore of the ria of Pontevedra, in the comarca of O Morrazo. This town is home to the Escuela Naval Militar de Oficiales (Naval Academy for Officers).

Formerly named San Xiao Ancorados by ships anchored nearby, but it is a popular distortion of "Encoirados," meaning leather tanneries, as they were in the Lameira river which flows into the urban center of the village. Father Sarmiento says the town’s name came from the Latin word mare, meaning sea, but it is now known to be derived from the name of a former possessor of this land named Marinus. Marín derives from Marini, "property of Marinus." Both references to the sea are, therefore, pure coincidences.

== Demographics ==
Population growth.

- 2018: 24,362
- 2007: 25,885
- 2006: 26.190
- 2005: 26.103
- 2003: 24.825

=== Immigration to Marin ===
As of 2006, the migrant group is 3.49% of the total municipality population. 32% are from the same province of Galicia, the second are foreign-born groups at 30%. 35.9% of the foreign born population are from South America. Then sub-Saharan Africa (mainly from Ghana, then Sierra Leone and Nigeria). In the central Urban population foreign-born populations constitute 9.07% of the total in 2006.

Population	Median age	% Men	% Women	% Younger than 20 years	% from 20 to 64 years	% 65 or above
2004	39.4	37.7	41.1	20.3	64.3	15.4

== Signs of identity ==
Marín is home to the Naval Academy, the only facility of its kind in Spain, which was moved from San Fernando (Cádiz) in 1943. The King of Spain (who also studied at the academy), visits the school each Day of Carmen (July 16) to preside over the ceremony of the Pledge of Allegiance and Delivery Offices. With the abolition of compulsory military service in 1996, under then Prime Minister Jose Maria Aznar, the use of these facilities has significantly decreased.

Marin’s beaches receive thousands of visitors each year and are the star attraction of the municipality. The main beaches are Portocelo, Mogor, Aguete, Loire, O Santo and Lapamán. In 2006, the beaches of Portocelo, Mogor, Aguete and Loire were added as Blue Flag beaches.

Marín is also home to the Palace of Cadro, the oldest pazo (fortress) in Galicia and the family seat of the House of Romay.

== Sports ==
Since 2013, the town's professional basketball team CB Peixefresco plays in the LEB Oro.

== See also ==
- Category:People from Marín, Pontevedra
- Ferrol Spanish Capital of the Maritime Department of the North (1788 AD).
- Spanish Naval Academy (ENM) In modern times, Institution where the Spanish Armada officers and other personnel receive their education.
- "El Galatea" (also known as Glenlee) From 1922 till 1969 it was the Training Tall Ship for the Spanish Navy in Ferrol (Northwestern Spain).
- "El Juan Sebastián Elcano" Currently, Training Tall Ship for the Spanish Navy in the Escuela Naval Militar de Oficiales de Marín.
- Structure of the Spanish Navy in the 21st century
- List of municipalities in Pontevedra

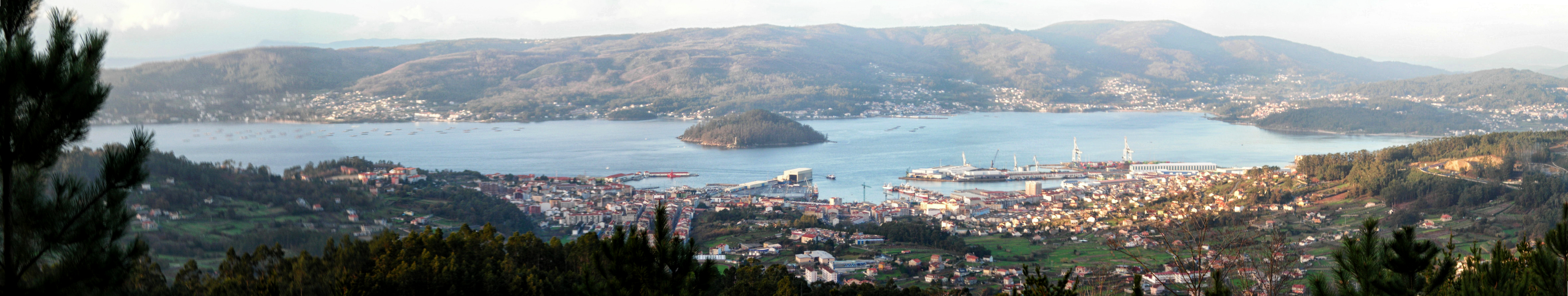
Panoramic view of Marín
