= Litto =

Litto may refer to:

== People ==
- Litto, also known as Lippo II Alidosi (died 1350), Italian ruler
- Litto Nebbia (born 1948), Argentinian musician
- George Litto (1930-2019), American producer
- Maria Litto (1919–1996), German ballet dancer

== Places ==
- Litto, Latin and Italian name of the ancient city of Lyctus, Crete
- Monte Litto, Campania, Italy

== See also ==
- Lito (disambiguation)
