= O Morrazo =

Coordinates: 42°19′57″N 8°43′48″W

- Comarca
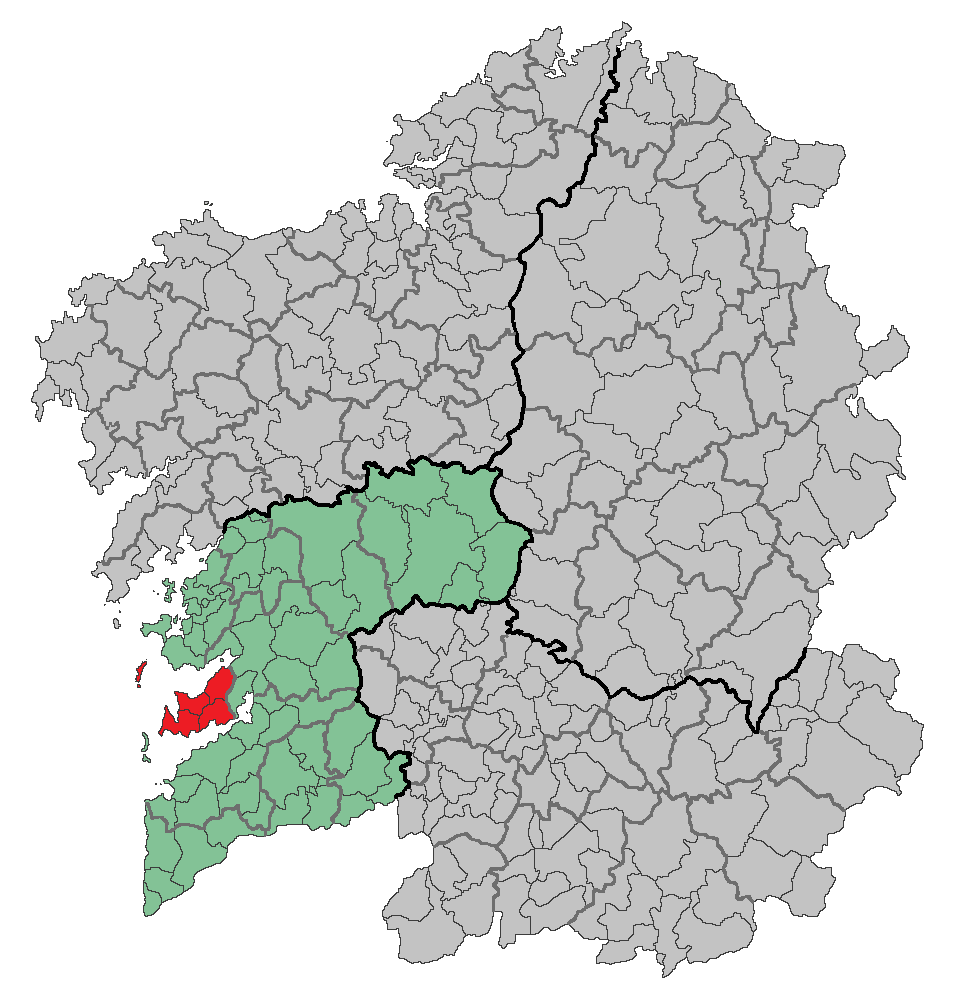
- Country: Spain
- Autonomous community: Galicia
- Province: Pontevedra
- Capital: Cangas do Morrazo
- Municipalities: List: Bueu, Cangas do Morrazo, Marín, Moaña

Area
  - Total: 140.1 km^{2} (54.1 sq mi)

Population (2018)
  - Total: 82,445
  - Density: 588.5/km^{2} (1,524/sq mi)
- Demonym: morracense
- Time zone: UTC+1 (CET)
  - Summer (DST): UTC+2 (CEST)

O Morrazo is a comarca in the Galician province of Pontevedra. It covers an area of 140.1 sq.km, and the overall population of this comarca was 83,305 at the 2011 Census; the latest official estimate (as at the start of 2018) was 82,445.

It is bounded on the north by the estuary of Pontevedra, to the east with the comarca of Pontevedra, to the south with the Vigo estuary and to the west by the Atlantic Ocean. This is the smallest comarca in terms of area in Galicia, and one of the five most densely populated.

== Municipalities ==
The comarca comprises the following four municipalities:

Name of municipality	Population (2001)	Population (2011)	Population (2018)
Bueu	12,350	12,339	12,148
Cangas do Morrazo	23,981	26,332	26,487
Marín	24,997	25,357	24,362
Moaña	17,887	19,277	19,448
Totals	79,215	83,305	82,445

== Official comarca of Morrazo and historical Morrazo ==
The region of O Morrazo is a peninsula, situated between the estuaries of Pontevedra and Vigo.

The current comarca of the Morrazo corresponds to only part of the traditional region. Apart from the municipalities that compose it, it is traditionally part of Vilaboa as well (minus its parish of Bértola and that of Figueirido and neighborhood of Paredes in the parish of Vilaboa). The Pontevedra parishes of Louizán also forms part of the historical O Morrazo and most of the Salcedo parish. The comarca formerly included the city of Pontevedra which formed part of O Morrazo within its vicariate.

== Gallery ==
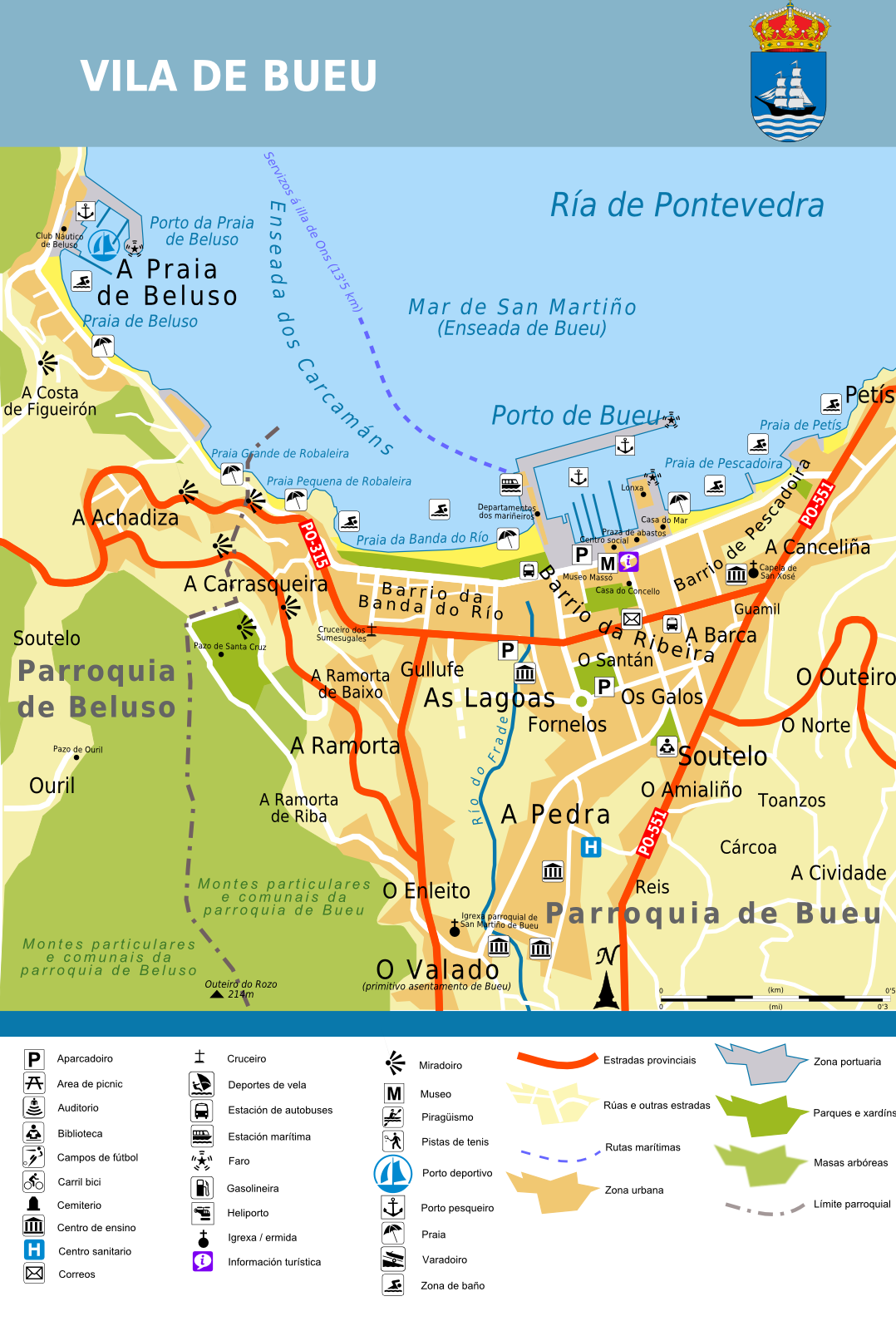
Map of Bueu

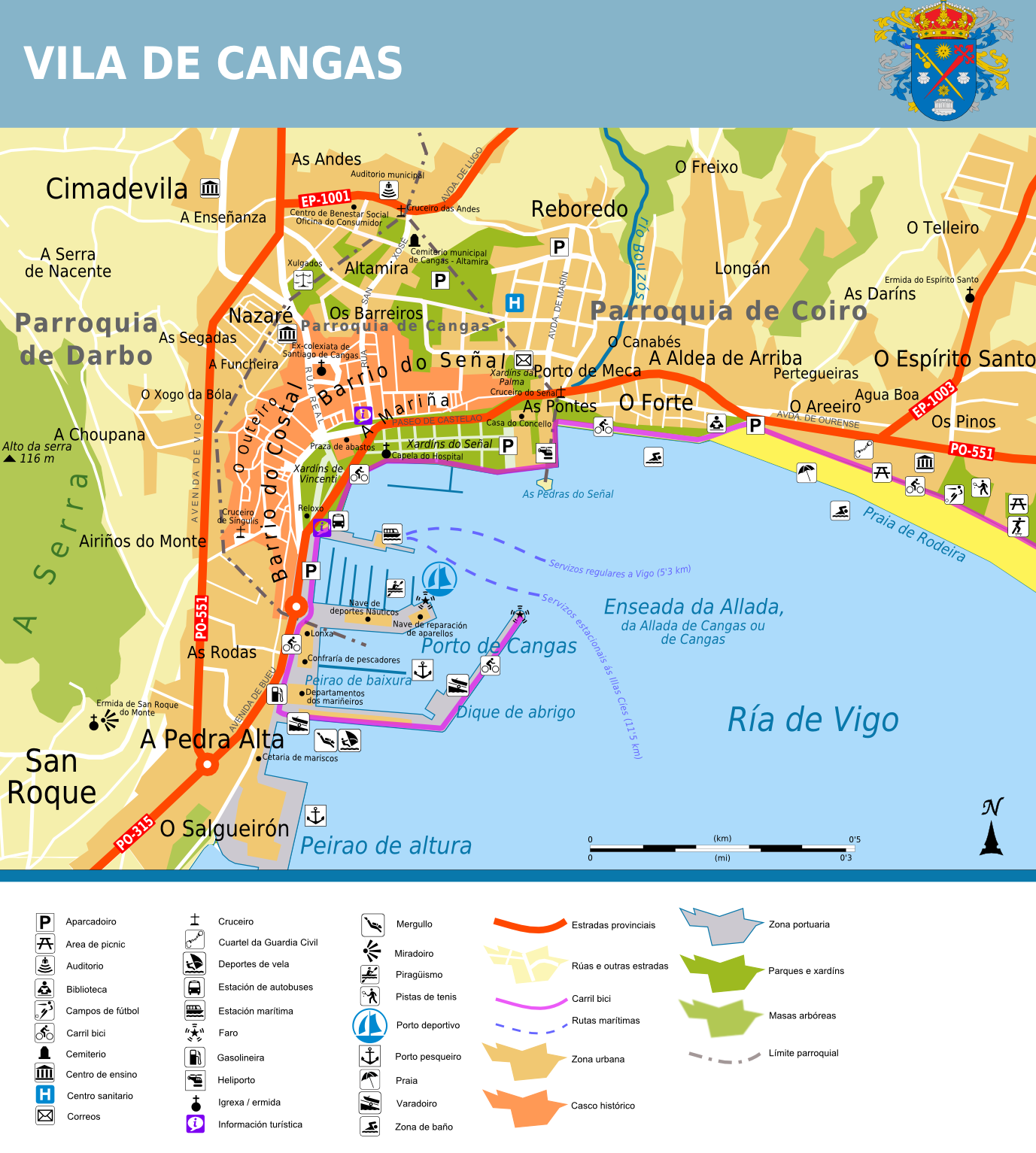
Map of Cangas

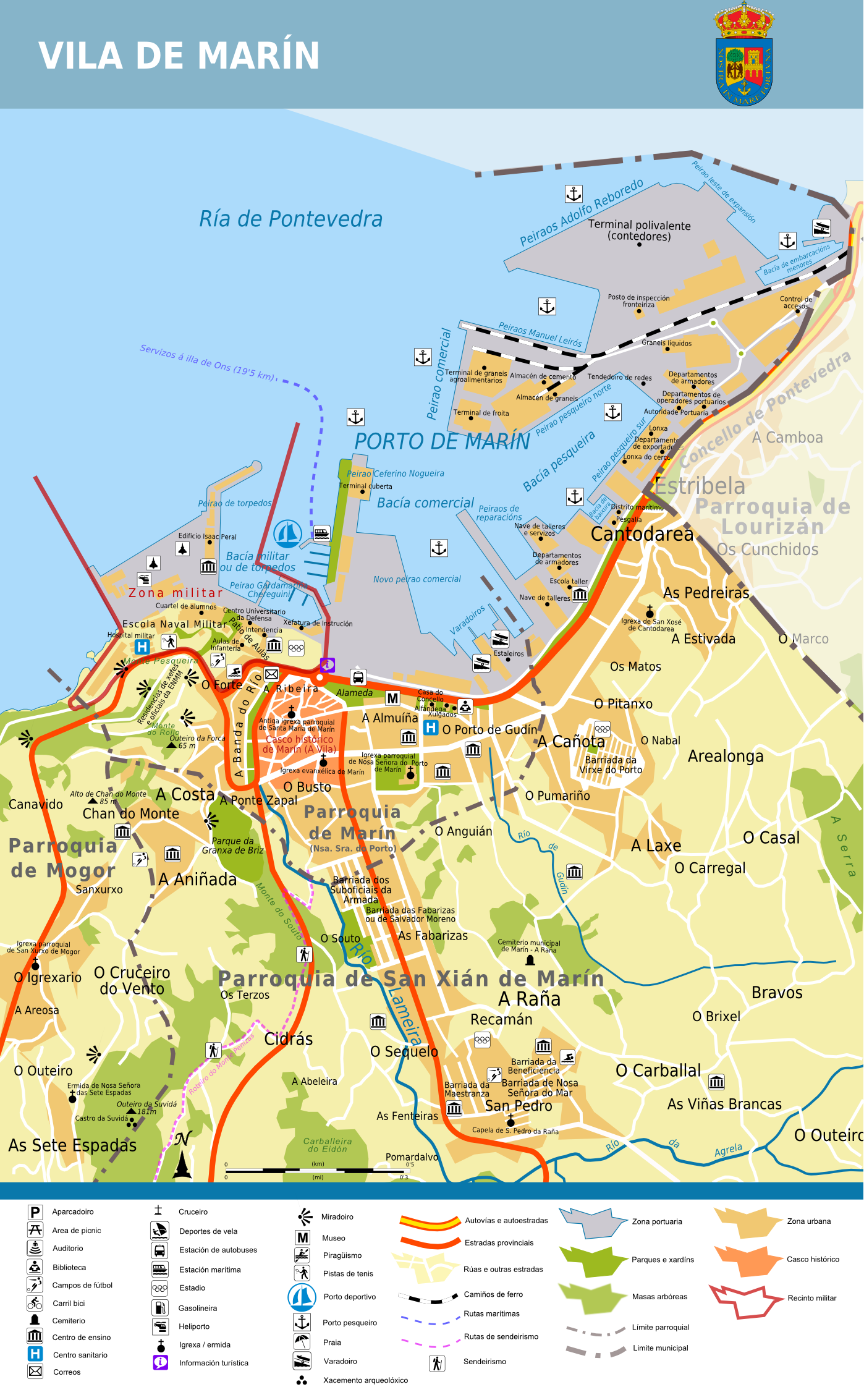
Map of Marín

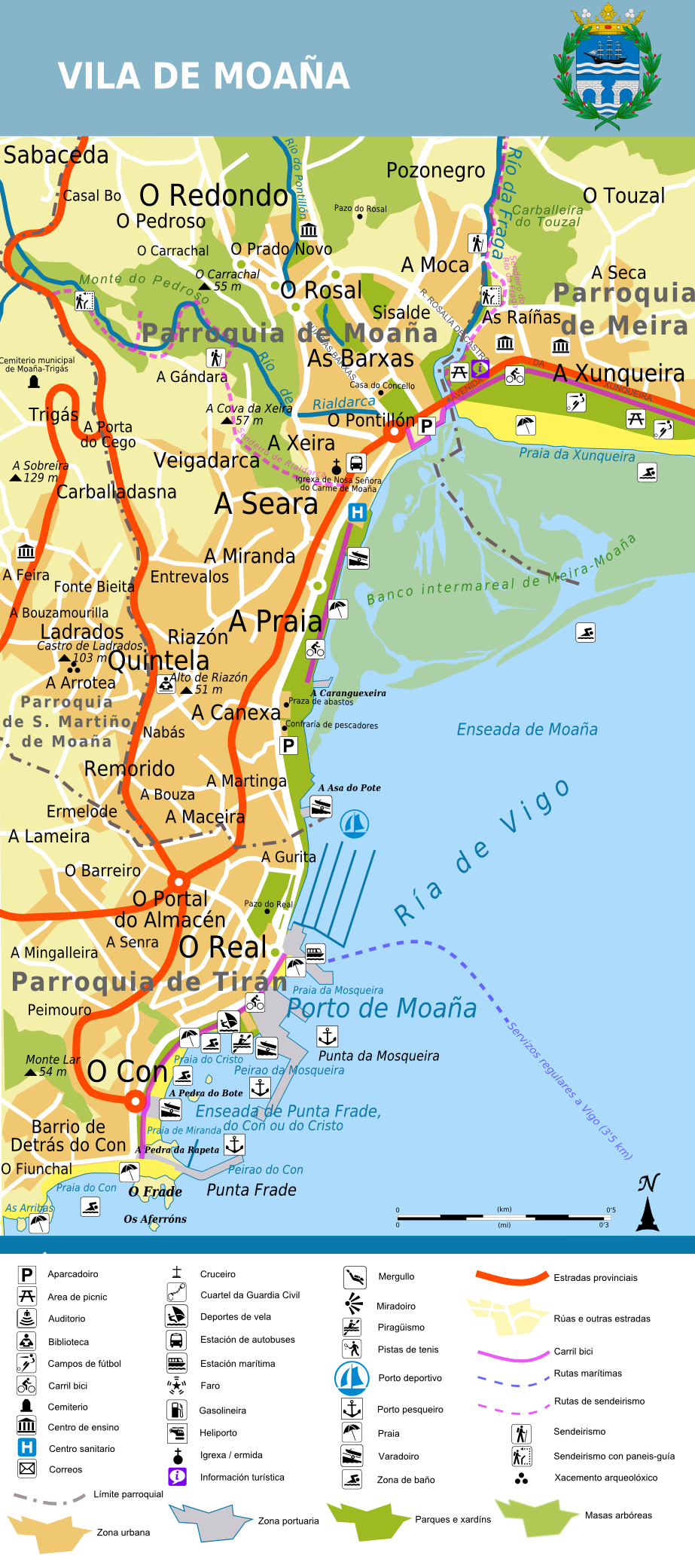
Map of Moaña
