= Interceltic Festival of Avilés =

Summer arts festival

- Genre: Folk music
- Dates: July each year.
- Locations: Avilés, Asturias; Spain
- Years active: 1997 - present
- Founders: Esbardu
- Website: www.intercelticu.com

The Interceltic Festival of Avilés (FIA) is a summer arts festival held annually in Avilés, and the surrounding area in Asturias, Spain since 1997. The festival is held to promote the cultural traditions, and developments, of the Celtic nations (países celtes in Asturias), especially music and dance, as well as painting, photography, theatre, sculpture, traditional craftsmanship, sport and gastronomy. It is organized by the Cultural Association Esbardu, located in Avilés.

== Background ==
The idea of a festival in Avilés arose after the Festival Interceltique de Lorient in 1993 when members of Esbardu took part in that festival. They started working on a similar (although smaller) idea in Avilés. In the summer of 1997 the project received a small budget from the Asturian regional government and another one from Avilés Town Hall. The festival was held again in the following year.

In 2006, 1,175 people took part in the festival with 150 acts and performances over eleven days. There were 800 musicians, dancers and actors in the parade. In 2008 it was officially named by the Regional Authorities of the Principality of Asturies, as the "Fiesta de Interés Turístico Regional"(Celebration of Regional Tourist Interest). In 2010 choirs from Wales participated in the festival, namely The Port Talbot Cymric Male Choir and Cor Meibion Y Fflint (Flint Male Voice Choir). The 'Cymric' as it is known, was the first Welsh male voice choir to perform at the 'Festival Interceltique de Lorient' and performed again in 1978. The choir was again invited to Lorient in 1992. Flint have appeared at Lorient five times as well as Interceltic Festivals in Nantes and Paris. They were winners of the Male Voice Choir competition in the 2007 Côr Cymru, and finalists again in 2009.

== Venue ==
The festival takes place in the Comarca de Avilés, in Asturias, between Cabo Peñas and the mouth of the Nalón river. Avilés, Castrillón, Corvera and Illas are the members of the Comarca.

== FIA 2008 ==
From 18 to 27 July 2008, the festival was held in Avilés and Comarca. Las Noches Célticas (The Celtic Nights):

=== Asturias ===
- La Bandina de la Curuxa
- Falanuncaduca
- Anabel Santiago and M.Lee Woolf

=== Brittany ===
- Merzhim
- Bagad Lann Bihoué
- Korriganed Panvrid

=== Wales ===
- Dawnswyr Tawerin

=== Galicia ===
- Inquedanzas
- B.G. Charamuscas de Bembrive

=== Ireland ===
- Beoga
- Classac

=== Scotland ===
- Fred Morrison
- The Tannahill Weavers
- Culter and District Pipe Band
- The Red Hot Chilli Pipers

== FIA 2007 ==
Participants in the 11th festival included

- Curran - Fegan from Ireland
- Inquedanzas from Tui Pontevedra, Galicia
- Banda de Gaitas Ledicia from Sanguiñeda Mos, Pontevedra
- Dawnswyr Môn folk dancers from Anglesey, Wales
- The Red Hot Chilli Pipers from Scotland
- Pitlochry and Blair Atholl Pipe Band from Scotland
- Capercaillie a folk band from Scotland
- Ballocheam Highland Dancers from Stirlingshire, Scotland
- Bagad Landi from Brittany
- Lann Tivizio from Brittany
- Cultural Association Esbardu: Organizers of the Festival
- Xera from Asturias
- La Bandina from Asturias
- Dúo Astur from Asturias

== Images ==
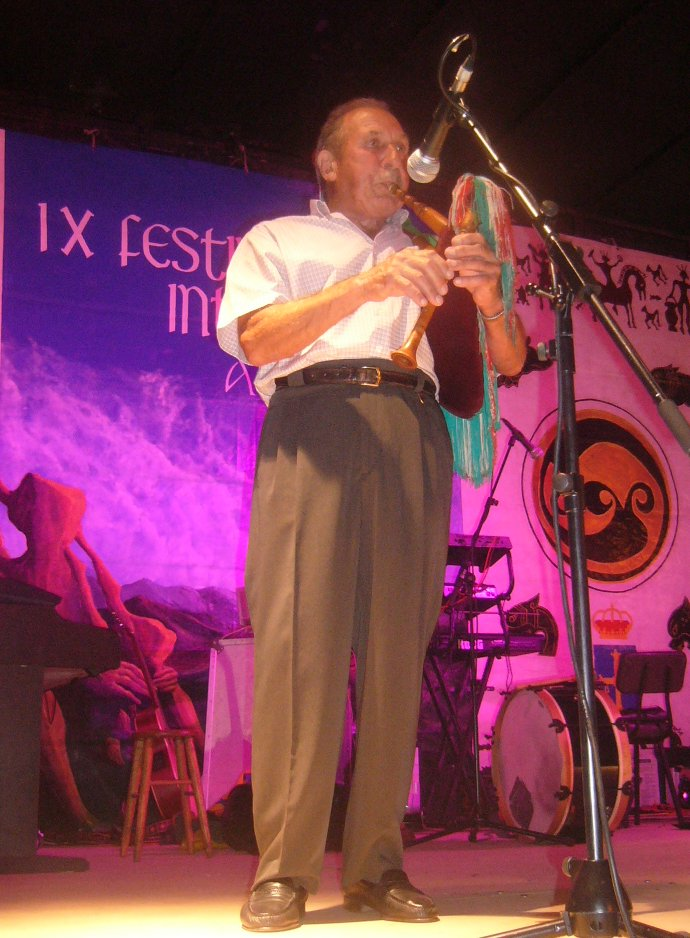
El Gaiteru de Veriña during the 9th Festival, 22 June 2005

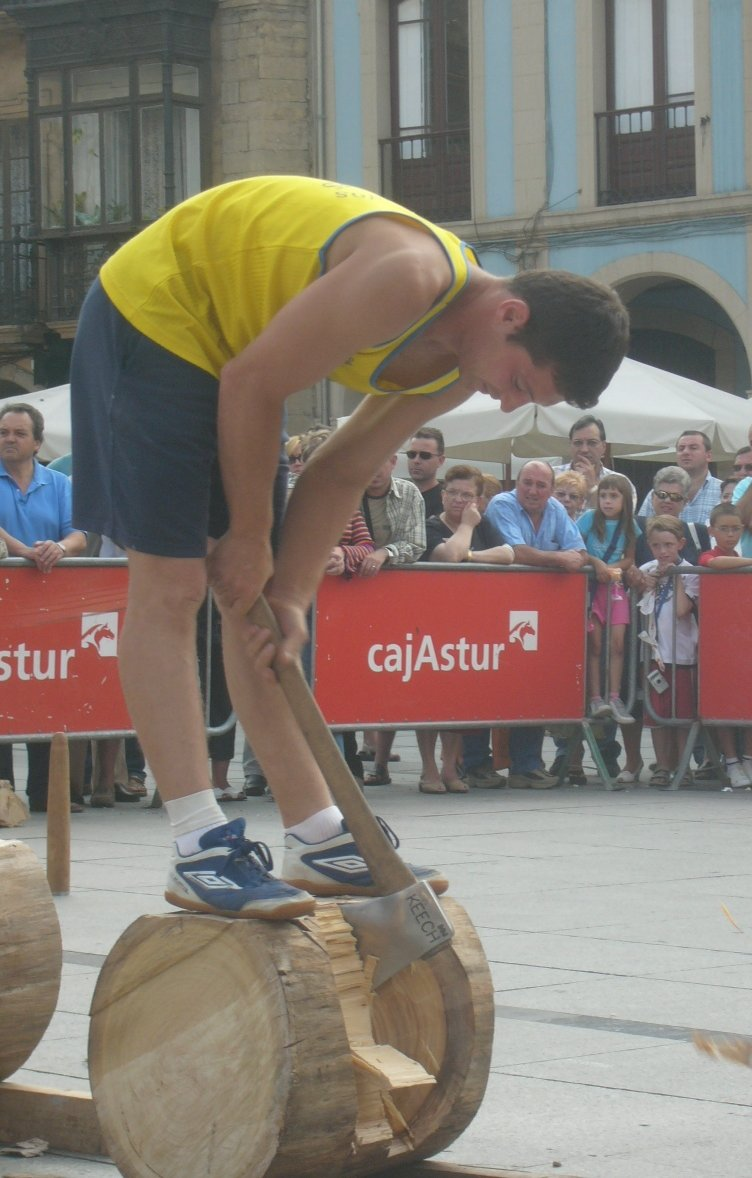
Axe cutting (2005)

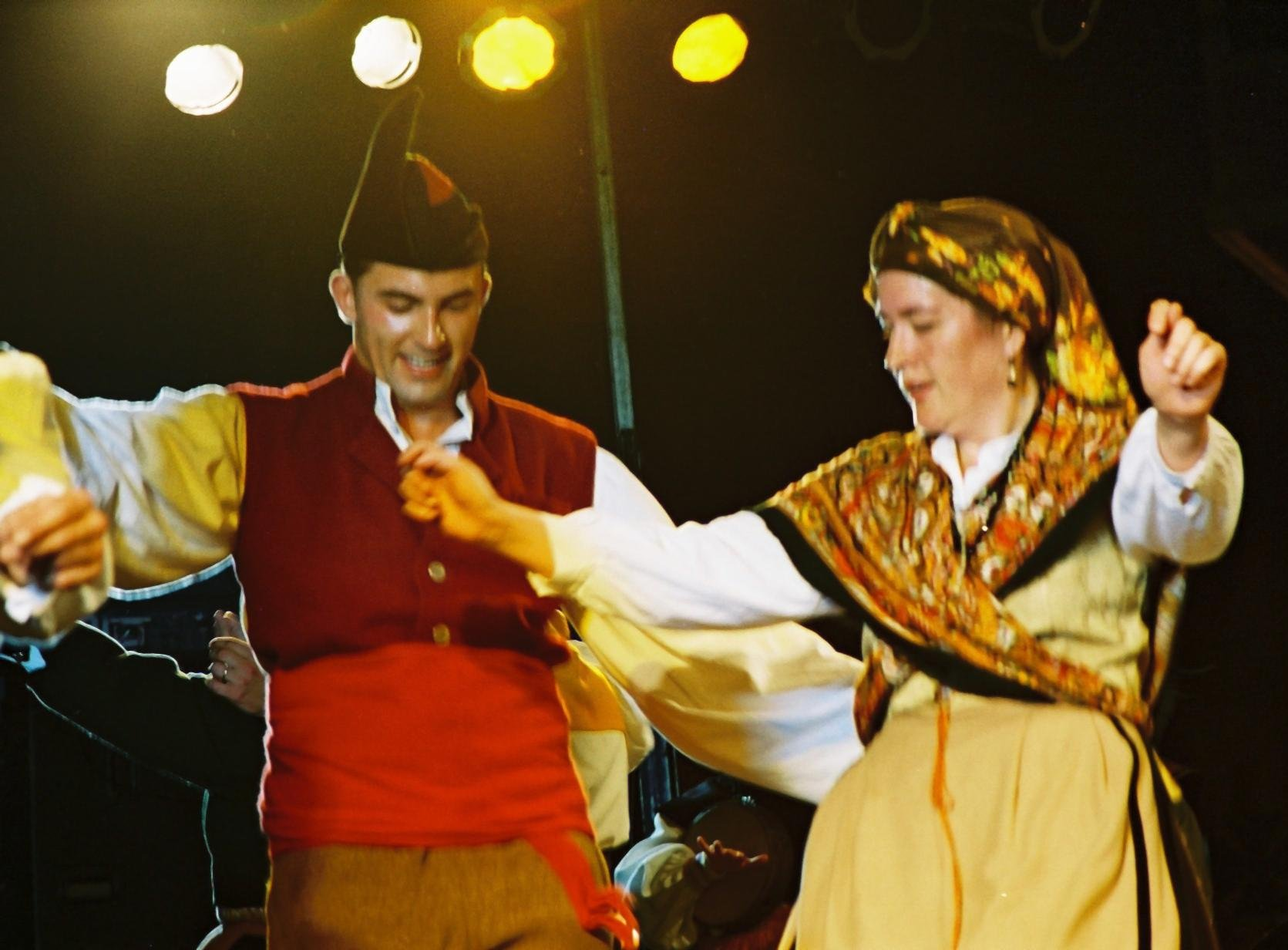
Traditional dancing couple Asturias (2004)

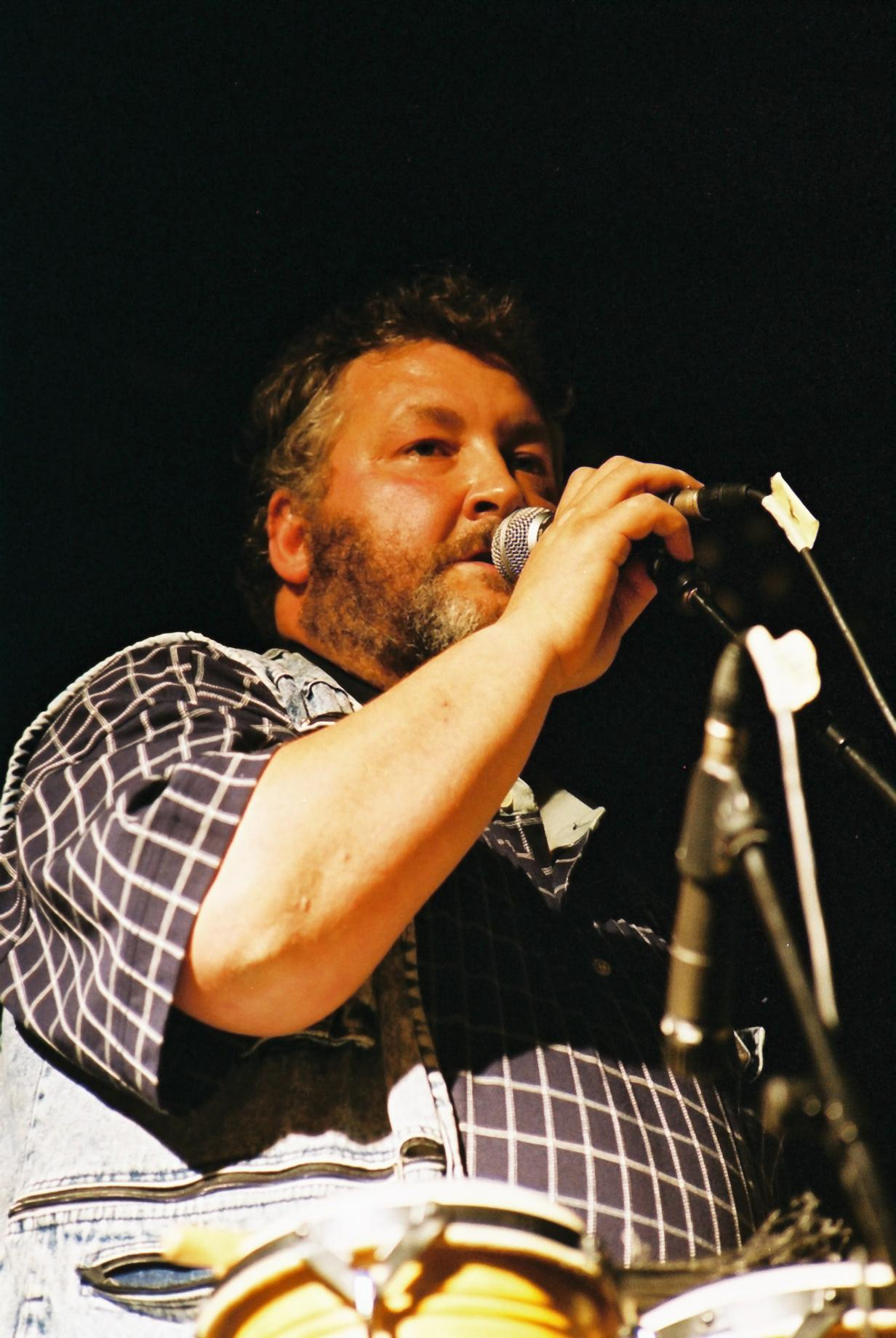
Fonsu Mielgo (Llan de Cubel) in a performance during the 8th Festival in 2004

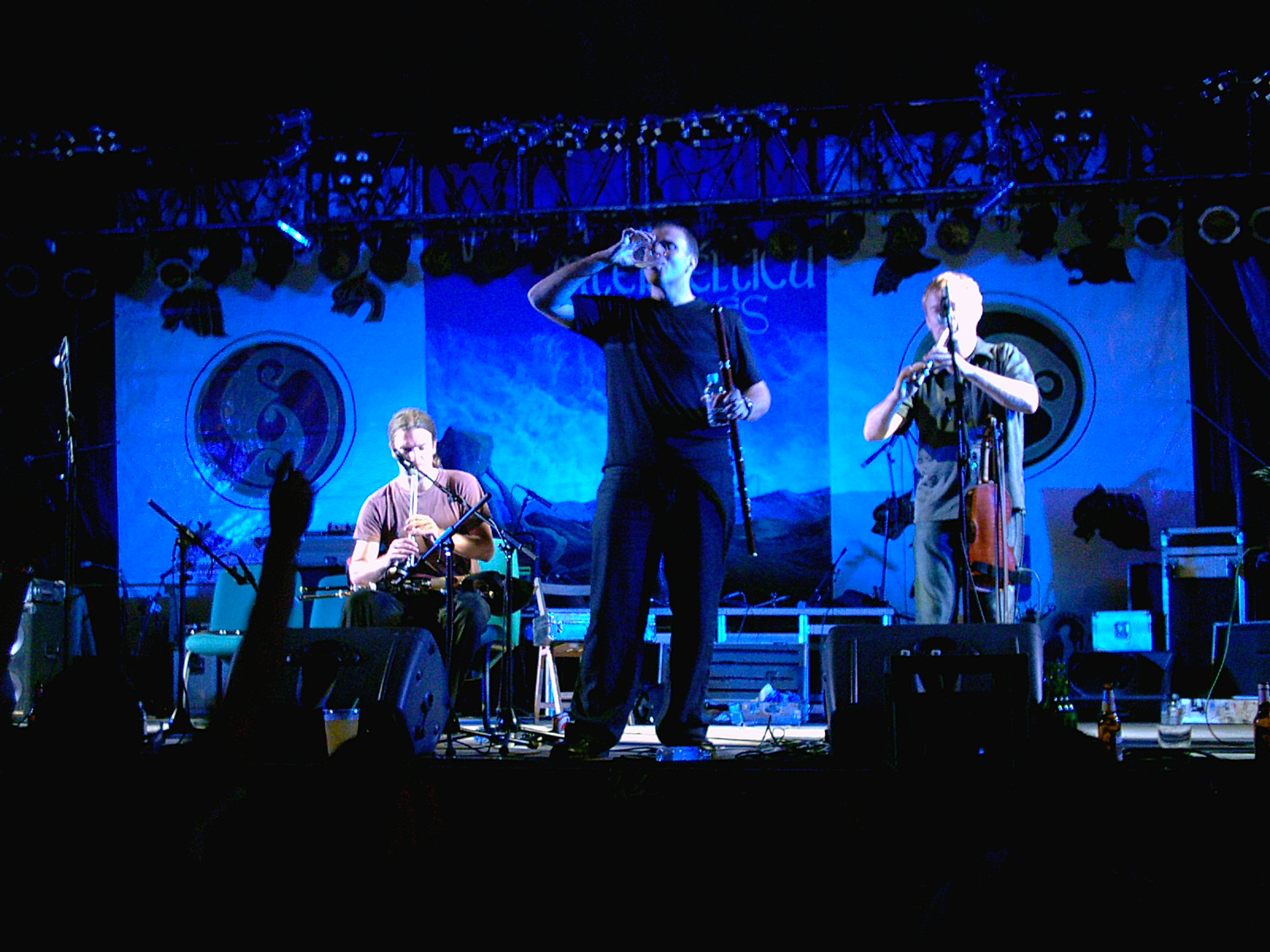
Lúnasa performance at the 8th Festival in 2004

== See also ==
- Interceltic Festival of Morrazo, Galicia
- Festival Interceltique de Lorient, France
