= Santiago Castroviejo =

Spanish botanist (1946–2009)

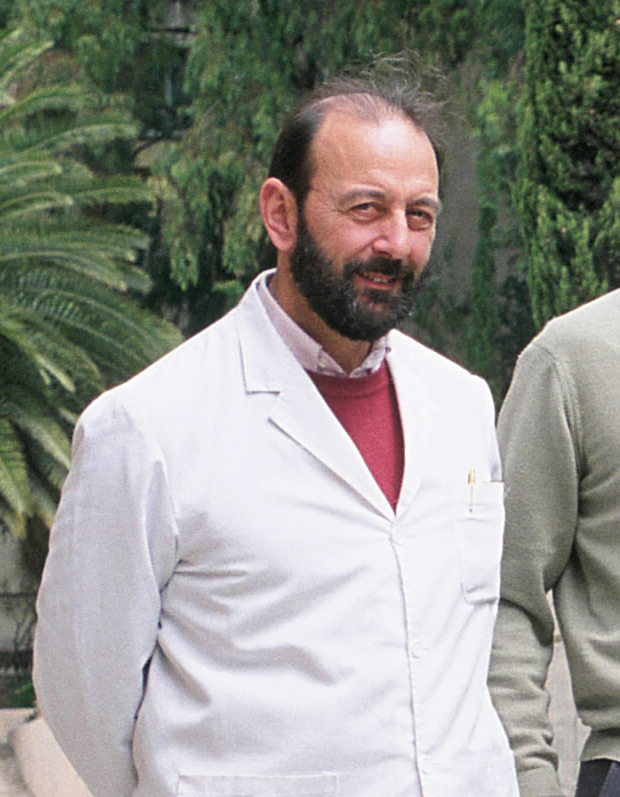
- Photo in the Real Jardín Botánico de Madrid, 1993
- Born: 27 August 1946; Tirán, Spain
- Died: 30 September 2009 (aged 63); Madrid, Spain
- Siglum: Castrov.
- Education: Complutense University of Madrid
- Occupations: Botanist; professor
- Awards: Alejandro Malaspina National Research Award (2009)

Santiago Castroviejo y Bolíbar (abbreviation Castrov.; 27 August 1946 in Tirán, Moaña – 30 September 2009 in Madrid) was a Spanish botanist. He is credited with identifying and naming 63 species in the IPNI (International Plant Names Index). The abbreviation "Castrov." is used to indicate Santiago Castroviejo as an authority in the scientific description and classification of species.

== Biography ==
He earned his PhD in Biology from the Complutense University of Madrid in 1972. Santiago Castroviejo was a research professor at the Real Jardín Botánico (Spanish National Research Council), Director of the Real Jardín Botánico de Madrid between 1984 and 1994. He was the scientific director of the Coiba Project at the Coiba Biological Station (Panama), principal investigator of the Flora iberica Project, principal investigator of the Anthos Project – Information System on Spanish Plants, member of the executive committee and the Steering Committee respectively of the projects: Euro+Med PlantBase and Species Plantarum Project-Flora of the World, President of the Spanish Royal Society of Natural History, Academician of the Real Academia de Ciencias Exactas, Físicas y Naturales and Médaille du Conseil de la Société Botanique de France, among other important scientific distinctions. He was awarded the National Research Prize in 2009. He supervised 19 doctoral theses and authored more than 150 research papers published in national and international scientific journals.

== Selected publications ==
- Castroviejo, S. & Ibáñez, A. (eds.) 2006. Estudios sobre la biodiversidad en la región de Bahía Honda. Biblioteca de Ciencias (CSIC) – RACEFyN. 835 pp.
- Castroviejo, S.; Sánchez-Monge, E. 2004. De familias géneros y especies. La eterna búsqueda de la estabilidad en la clasificación biológica. Discurso de ingreso en el Real Academia de Cienciencias Exactas, Físicas y Naturales. Madrid, 79 pp.
- Castroviejo, S. (Coord. Gen.) 2008. Flora iberica, XVIII. xlvii + 678 pp. CSIC, Madrid
- Castroviejo, S. 2008. Blysmus Panz. ex Schult. en S. Castroviejo (Coord. gen.), S. Castroviejo, M. Luceño, A. Galán, F.J. Cabezas & P. Jiménez Mejías (eds.) Flora iberica XVIII: 69–71
- Castroviejo, S. 2008. Cladium P.Browne, en S. Castroviejo (Coord. gen.), S. Castroviejo, M. Luceño, A. Galán, F.J. Cabezas & P. Jiménez Mejías (eds.) Flora iberica XVIII:102–104
- Castroviejo, S. 2008. Cyperus L., en S. Castroviejo (Coord. gen.), S. Castroviejo, M. Luceño, A. Galán, F.J. Cabezas & P. Jiménez Mejías (eds.) Flora iberica XVIII: 8–27
- Castroviejo, S. 2008. Kyllinga Rottb., en S. Castroviejo (Coord. gen.), S. Castroviejo, M. Luceño, A. Galán, F.J. Cabezas & P. Jiménez Mejías (eds.). Flora iberica XVIII: 32–34
- Castroviejo, S. 2008. Pycreus P.Beauv., en S. Castroviejo (Coord. gen.), S. Castroviejo, M. Luceño, A. Galán, F.J. Cabezas & P. Jiménez Mejías (eds.). Flora iberica XVIII: 27–32
- Castroviejo, S. 2008. Scirpoides Ség., en S. Castroviejo (Coord. gen.), S. Castroviejo, M. Luceño, A. Galán, F.J. Cabezas & P. Jiménez Mejías (eds.). Flora iberica XVIII: 60–62
- Castroviejo, S. 2006. Más sobre Cyperus y Kylinga en la Península ibérica. Acta Bot. Malacitana 31: 232–238
- Castroviejo, S. 2006. Presentación. En S. Castroviejo & A. Ibáñez (eds.) 2006. Estudios sobre la biodiversidad en la región de Bahía Honda: 13–14. Biblioteca de Ciencias (CSIC) – RACEFyN
- Castroviejo, S. 2006. Taxonomy, Floras and Conservation; en E. Leadlay & S.L. Jury (eds.) 2006. Taxonomy and Plant Conservation: the Cornerstone of the Conservation and the Sustainable Use of Plants: 96–100. Cambridge University Press
- Castroviejo, S.; Aedo, C. & Medina, L. 2006. Management of floristic information on the Internet: the Anthos solution. Willdenowia 36: 127–136
- Quintanar, A; Catalán, P; Castroviejo, S. 2006. Adscription of Parafestuca albida (Lowe) e.b. Alexeev to Koeleria Pers. Taxon 55 (3): 664–670
- Castroviejo, S. 2003. Heracleum L. In: Nieto Feliner, G., S. L. Jury & A. Herrero (eds.) Flora iberica 10: 365–368.CSIC, Madrid
- Brummitt, R. K., Castroviejo, S., Chikuni, A. C., Orchard A. E., Smith, G. F. & Wagner, W.L. 2001. The Species Plantarum Project, an international collaborative initiative for higher plant taxonomy. Taxon 50: 1217–1230

== Honors ==
=== Eponyms ===
The genus Castroviejoa has been named in his honor (Galbany, L.Sáez & Benedí 2004)

And various species have been named after him.

- Acalypha castroviejoi Cardiel in Brittonia 46(3): 205. 1994
- Amphibolips castroviejoi Medianero & Nieves-Aldrey in Zootaxa 2360: 48. 2010
- Aragoa castroviejoi Fern. Alonso in Anales Jard. Bot. Madrid 51(1): 82. 1993
- Armeria castroviejoi Nieto Fel. in Anales Jard. Bot. Madrid 44(2): 330. 1987
- Astragalus castroviejoi Talavera & Sánchez-Gómez in Anales Jard. Bot. Madrid 67(1): 42. 2010
- Carex castroviejoi Luceño & Jim.Mejías in Acta Bot. Malacitana 34. 2009
- Cuscuta castroviejoi M.Á.García in Ann. Bot. Fenn. 36(3): 167. 1999
- Filago castroviejoi Andrés-Sánchez, D.Gut.Larr., E.Rico & MMMart.Ort. in Bot. J. Linn. Soc. 179(4): 748. 2015
- Hippocrepis castroviejoi Talavera & E.Domínguez in Anales Jard. Bot. Madrid 57(2): 461. 2000
- Hyptis jacobi Fern.Alonso in Anales Jard. Bot. Madrid 67(2): 127–135. 2010
- Ophrys × castroviejoi Serra & JX Soler in An. Jard. Bot. Madrid 69(2): 237. 2012
- Rubus castroviejoi Mon.-Huelin in Bot. J. Linn. Soc. 115(1): 52. 1994
- Trinia castroviejoi Gómez Nav., Roselló, E.Laguna, PPFerrer, Peris, A. Guillén, A. Valdés & Sanchis in Sabuco 11: 18. 2015

Among his friends, he was known by the nickname Tatayo, which was used to dedicate a species.

- Colymbada × tatayana (Fern.Casas & Susanna) Fern.Casas & Susanna in Fontqueria 2: 20 (1982) [= Centaurea × tatayana Fern. Casas & A. Susanna (= C. toletana Boiss. & Reuter var. toletana x C. ornata Willd.) in Anales Jard. Bot. Madrid 38(2): 530. 1982]
