= Litos (footballer, born January 1974) =

Portuguese footballer

Personal information
- Full name: Carlos Humberto da Silva Ferreira
- Date of birth: 11 January 1974 (age 52)
- Place of birth: Braga, Portugal
- Height: 1.78 m (5 ft 10 in)
- Position: Goalkeeper

Youth career
- 1984–1985: Santa Tecla
- 1985–1992: Braga

Senior career*
Years	Team	Apps	(Gls)
1992–1994	Vieira		
1994–1995	Neves		
1995–1998	Vianense	62	(0)
1998–1999	Vizela	31	(0)
1999–2005	Varzim	98	(0)
2005–2007	Ribeirão	44	(0)
2007–2008	Beira-Mar	11	(0)
2008–2009	Ribeirão	21	(0)
2009–2016	Limianos	164	(0)
Total		431	(0)
- * Club domestic league appearances and goals

Carlos Humberto da Silva Ferreira (born 11 January 1974 in Braga), known as Litos, is a Portuguese former footballer who played as a goalkeeper.
