= Manuel Costas (footballer, born 1947) =

Spanish footballer

Personal information
- Full name: Manuel Costas Bermúdez
- Date of birth: 13 September 1947 (age 79)
- Place of birth: Moaña, Spain
- Position: Forward

Senior career*
Years	Team	Apps	(Gls)
1965–1969	Celta Vigo	66	(14)
1969–1970	Racing de Ferrol	22	(4)
1970–1972	Hércules	20	(0)
Total		108	(18)
- * Club domestic league appearances and goals

Manuel Costas Bermúdez (born 13 September 1947) is a Spanish former professional footballer who played as a forward.

== Career ==
Born in Moaña, Costas played for Celta Vigo, Racing de Ferrol and Hércules.
