= Naval Military Academy =

Naval academy in Marín, Spain

Coordinates: 42.3946°N 8.70535°W

Escuela Naval Militar (Naval Military Academy)
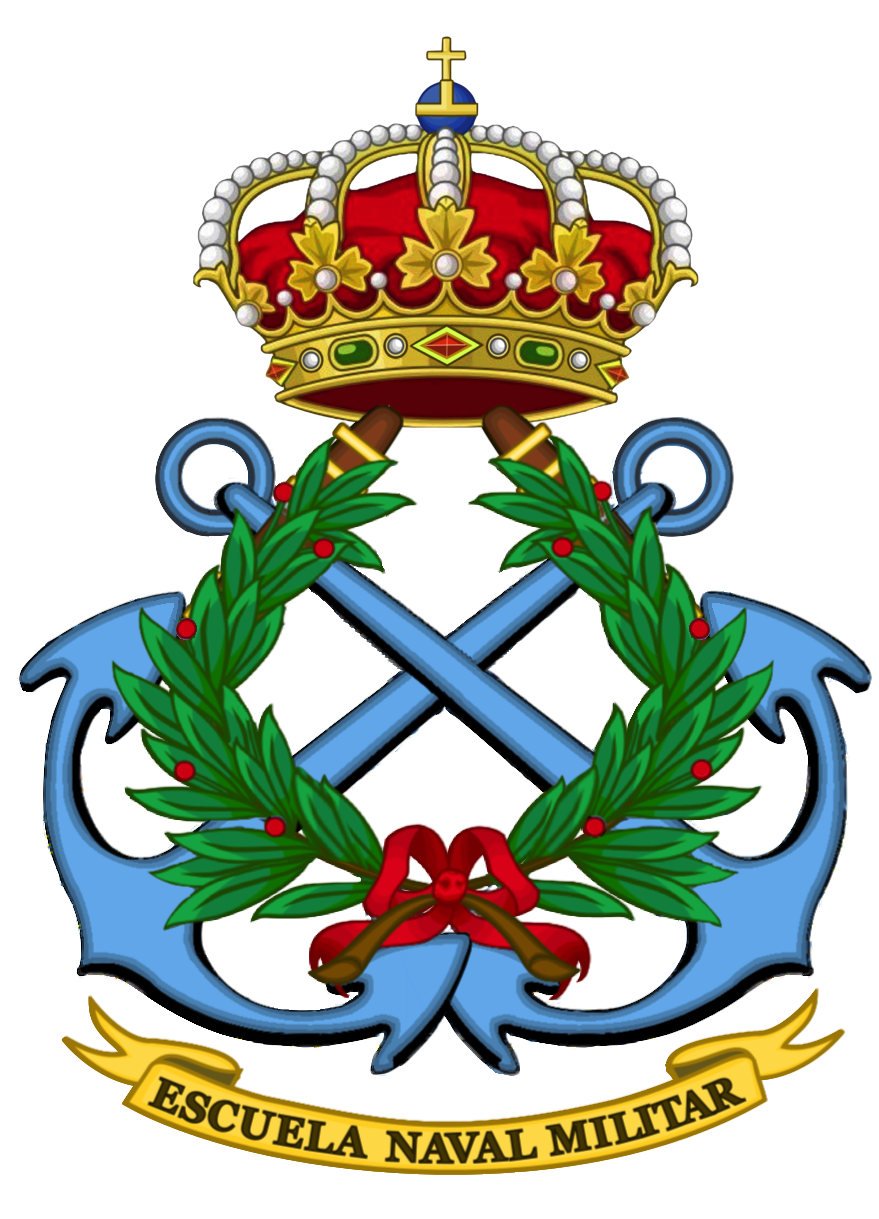
- Motto: Honor, Valor, Disciplina, Lealtad
- Motto in English: Honor, Courage, Discipline, Loyalty
- Type: Training
- Established: 1717
- Affiliations: Spanish Navy
- Director: Captain Ignacio Cuartero Lorenzo
- Location: Marín, Pontevedra, Galicia, Spain
- Website: https://armada.defensa.gob.es/ArmadaPortal/page/Portal/ArmadaEspannola/personalenm/prefLang-es/

The Naval Military Academy (Spanish: Escuela Naval Militar, ENM), at Marín, Pontevedra, in north-western Spain, is a coeducational naval academy that educates officers for commissioning primarily into the Spanish Navy and Spanish Navy Marines.

== History ==
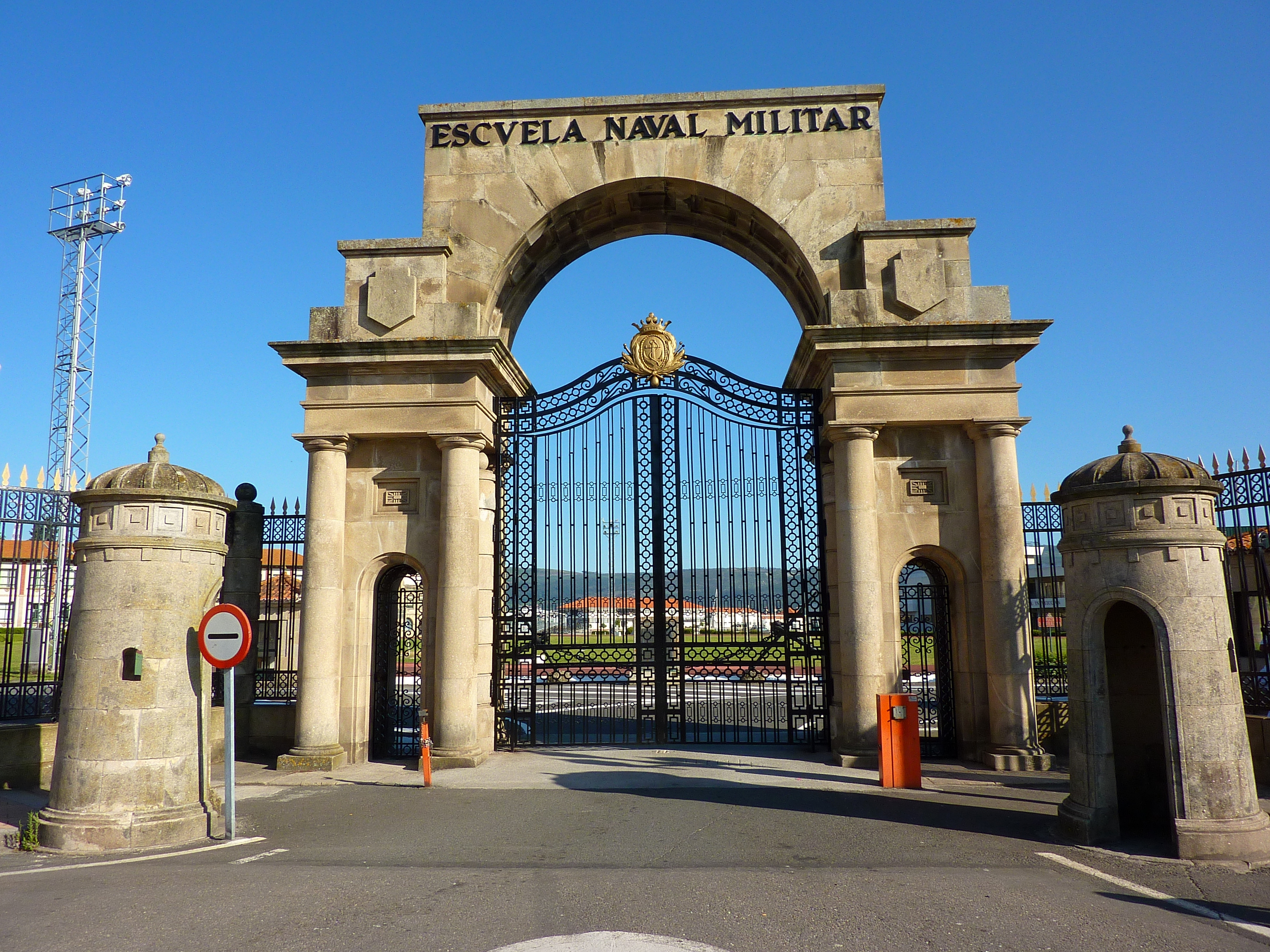
Puerta de Carlos V. Main entrance of the School.

It was established in 1717 as Real Compañía de Guardias Marinas (Royal Company of Maritime Guards) in Cádiz by José Patiño. In 1769 the institution moved to San Fernando, and in 1943 to its present location in Galicia.
