= Moaña =

- Municipality
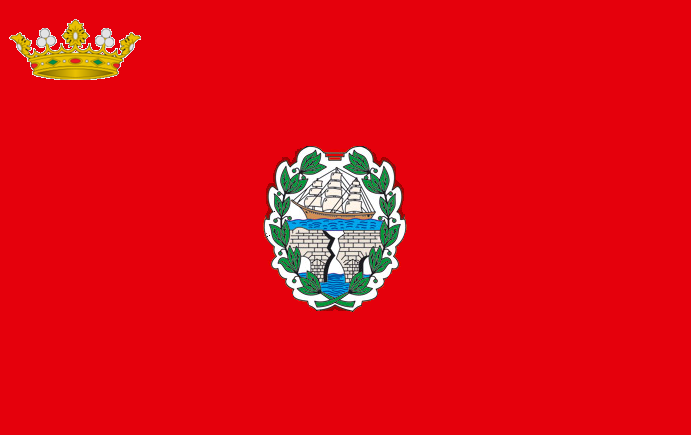
- Flag Coat of arms

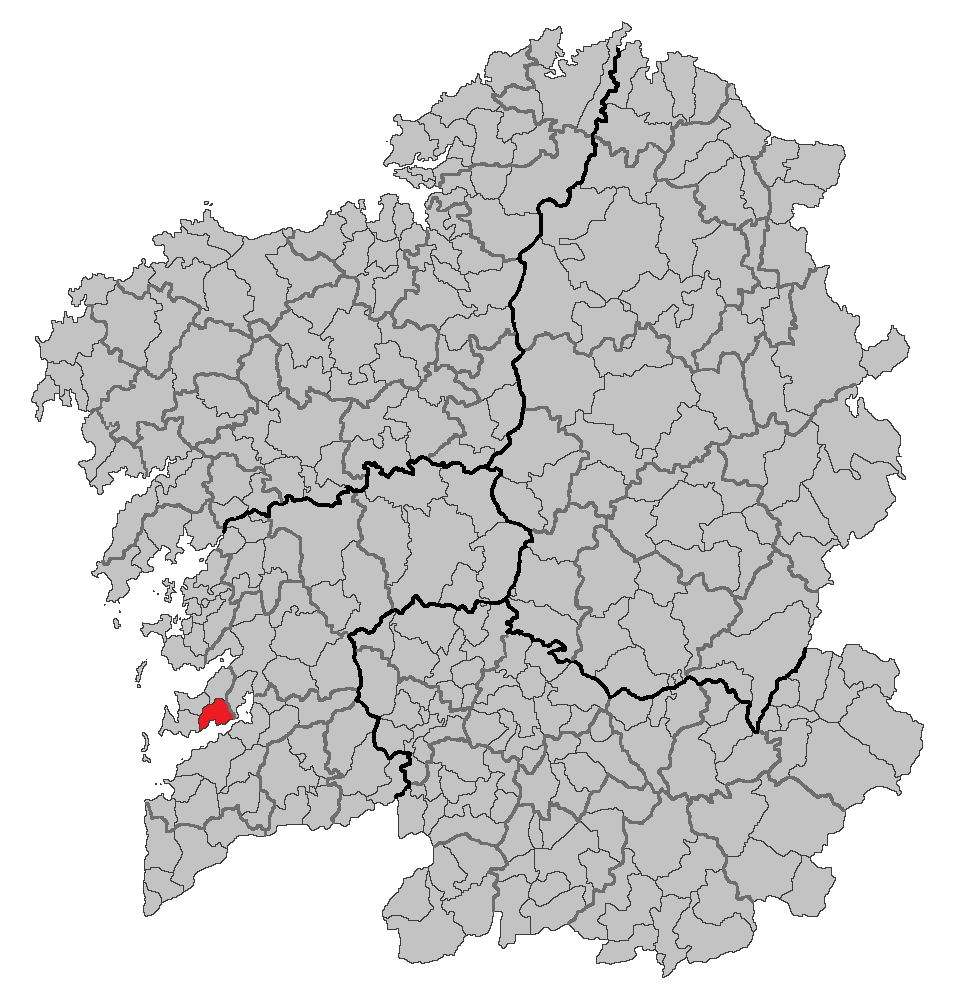
- Location of Moaña

- Location in Spain
- Coordinates: 42°17′N 8°45′W
- Country: Spain
- Autonomous community: Galicia
- Province: Pontevedra
- Comarca: O Morrazo
- Founded: 1836

Government
  - Alcalde: Xosé M. Millán Otero (BNG)

Area
  - Total: 31.5 km^{2} (12.2 sq mi)

Population (2025-01-01)
  - Total: 19,320
  - Density: 613/km^{2} (1,590/sq mi)
- Demonym(s): Moañés, -esa
- Time zone: UTC+1 (CET)
  - Summer (DST): UTC+2 (CEST)
- Postal code: 36950
- Website: www.concellodemoana.org

Moaña is a municipality located in Galicia, Spain in the province of Pontevedra. In 2018, it had a population of 19,448 inhabitants. It is one of the five municipalities with Bueu, Cangas do Morrazo, Marin and Vilaboa that forms the peninsula of O Morrazo. This peninsula separates the Ria of Vigo from the Ria of Pontevedra. The coast of Moaña has several beaches and the area combines tourism with traditional seafood production. The surrounding sea contains sea farms where mussels, oysters and other species are cultivated and it is an idyllic place for practicing sea sports activities. The Strait of Rande, where the Rande Bridge now connects Moaña with the municipality of Redondela, was the scene of the Battle of Vigo Bay (or Battle of Rande). Moaña has developed a significant cultural life with the highlights of this being the Interceltic Festival of Morrazo, the Week of Carnival and numerous other local feasts. Social movements were relevant in Moaña in the first half of the 20th century where the presence of the CNT (National Confederation of Labour) was significant. In fact, the current local pub/bar for retired people was the head office of this syndicate in Moaña during the Second Spanish Republic.

== History ==
The first reports of human occupation of these lands belong to the Acheulean period (75,000 BC). In the parishes of Domaio, O Carme, Meira and Tiran are also found flint tools and the remains of settlements dating from the Neolithic to the Middle Ages. Elements of the Beaker culture outside funeral environments were documented for the first time in Galicia in the area of A Fontela (Domaio). Tools and weapons of copper and bronze were found in Meira, Domaio and Tiran, where some relevant petroglyphs can be visited. The Castro culture is widely represented in the municipality with strong indications of romanization.

In the Middle Ages, Moaña was under the jurisdiction of the bishop of Iria Flavia and Santiago de Compostela. In the 7th century Norman attacks caused a loss of population throughout the Morrazo, but from the 12th century, took place a new resurgence of the population, after Archbishop Diego Gelmírez established a plan to defend the coast. From these dates are the churches of San Martino and San Xoán of Tiran. From the 14th century, families like the Meira, the Valadares or Soutomaior took control of the town. Noteworthy is the episode of the destruction of Meira Tower during the Irmandiño Wars (1467–1469).

The introduction of maize in the 17th century, changed local economy. Then 90% of arable land is utilized for the cultivation of this plant. As consequence, there is a raising of water mills along the rivers in the district. Fishing has been a key activity in the local economy during all that time. The arrival of entrepreneurs from Catalonia in the 17th century established the fish canning industry, generating a population and economic growth quite remarkable.

In 1702 comes the Battle of Rande where British and Netherland forces take and plunder Domaio, Meira and Tiran. One hundred years later (1809) battles are fought in this land against the French invaders.

== Climate ==
Moaña has a mild oceanic climate. Temperatures are not extreme, having an annual average of 15 °C. Precipitation ranges between 1300 and 1500 mm per year.

== Economy ==
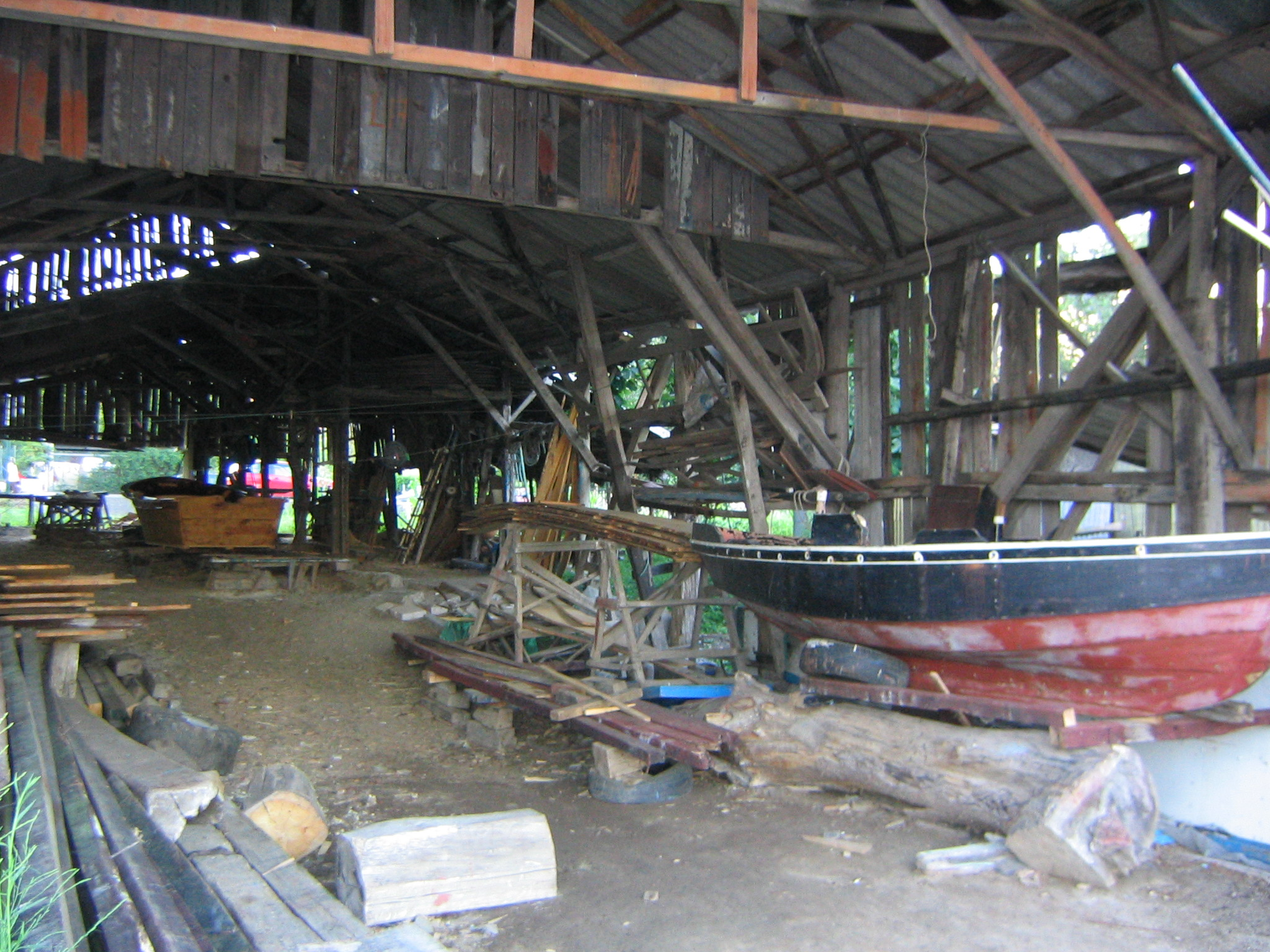
Traditional shipyard

The economy of Moaña has always been related to the sea. This relationship covers all the economic sectors. The activities of the primary sector complement industrial and services industries, which are also based on the maritime activities. The primary sector (mainly fishing) contains 24.4% of the working population (2006 data). 39% of the working population work within the secondary sector. This sector's main activities are building, shipyard activities and the canning of seafood. The services sector has 37% of the working population with shopping and tourism being the main activities. Tourism amenities within the area include a golf camp and three pleasure harbors.

== Hydrology ==
=== Beaches ===
The whole south limit of Moaña is coast. There are a series of rocky cliffs and beaches from the strait of Rande to the municipality of Cangas. Cliffs are short of height and there are some small beaches at their bottom. Large beaches are formed in the inlets. The most popular are:

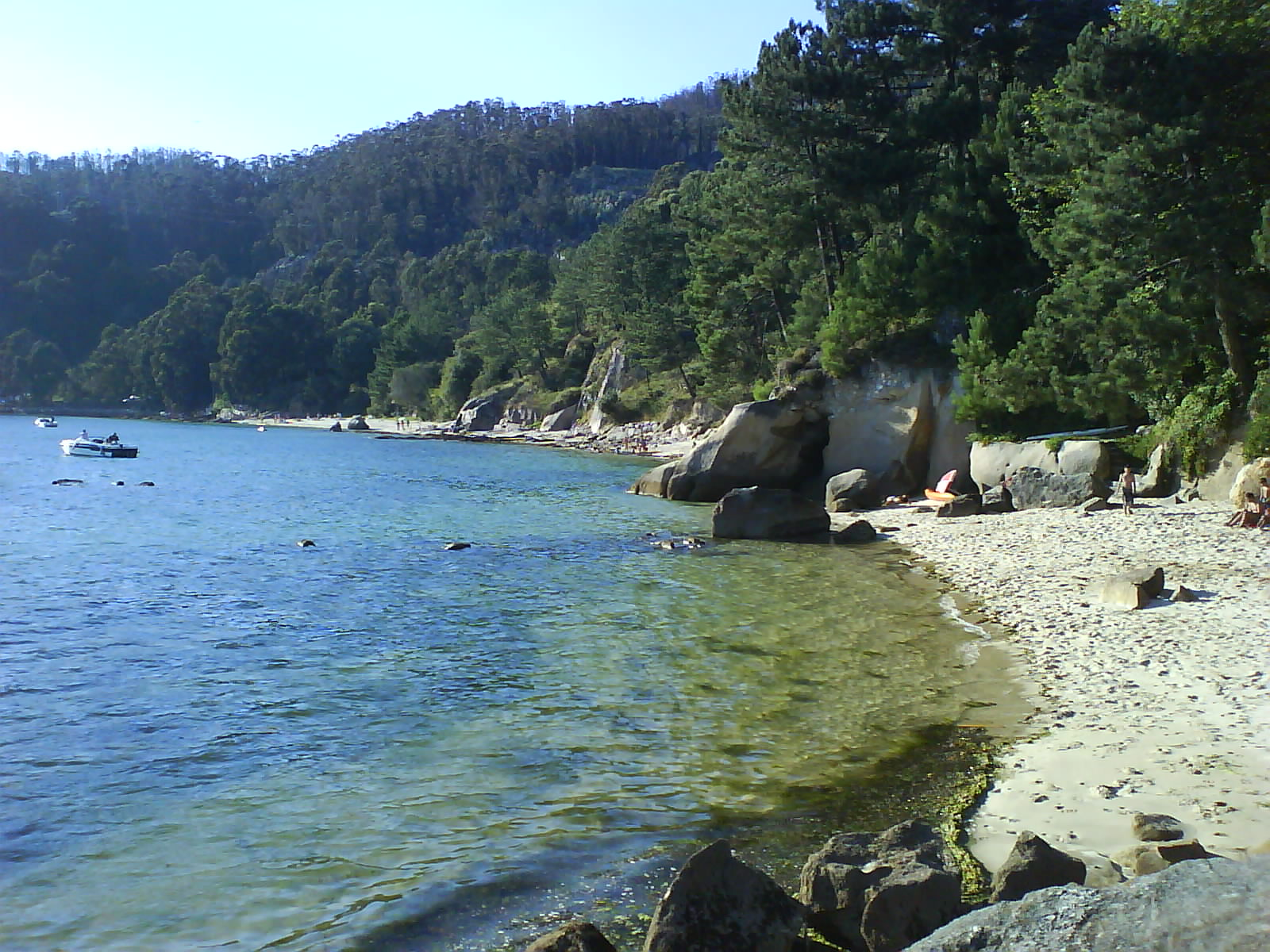
A Borna Beach.

- A Xunqueira Beach, located in the city centre. It is surrounded by a park and sportive premises.
- O Con Beach, located between the main dock of Moaña and Cortés cape. Good quality of sand. Fully equipped Blue Flag beach.
- Canabal Beach or Germans' Beach, located in the parish of Tirán, it is a very quiet place. Urban legend says that during the Second World War some German soldiers lived there.
- Domaio Beach, located next to the dock of Domaio.
- Meira Beach, located next to A Xunqueira beach, between Saint Bartolome's Island and the coast of the parish of Meira.
- Raven's Nest Beach (Praia do Niño do corvo), small beach located at the bottom of a short clift in the coast of Tirán.
- A Borna Beach, located in the parish of Domaio.
- Videira Beach, located in the parish of Tirán.

=== Rivers ===
There are several rivers and loads of streams, highlighting:

- A Fraga's River or Thieve's River It starts in Xaxán Mountain and it flows into the A Xunqueira beach. It is the largest in the entire municipality. It contains several small deep pools and waterfalls. There are 31 restored watermills integrated in a Watermill’s Route. Three of those are still in active.
- Freixa's River
- Hell's River
- Miñouba River, It starts in the Faro Mountain in the parish of Domaio. It has the famous Moura's deep pool.
- Ravine's River

== Monuments and places of interest ==
- Country House of O Rosal (Pazo do Rosal), interesting example of civil architecture in second half of 18th century. In the chapel is buried the rear admiral Casto Méndez Núñez.
- Dolmen of Chan Da Arquiña, within its boundaries is the highest point of Morrazo, Mount Faro, 622m high. Near the top is a recreational environment in which it is located this important megalithic monument with more than 5,000 years old. It consists of a polygonal chamber composed of eleven upright stones and a corridor. It was built facing east. Excavations found a complete funerary equipment consisting of stone tools and pottery fragments.
- Moaña Leisure Harbour, where to practice sea sport activities like sailing or sport fishing.
O Beque Reception

O Beque Terrace

O Beque Swimming Pool

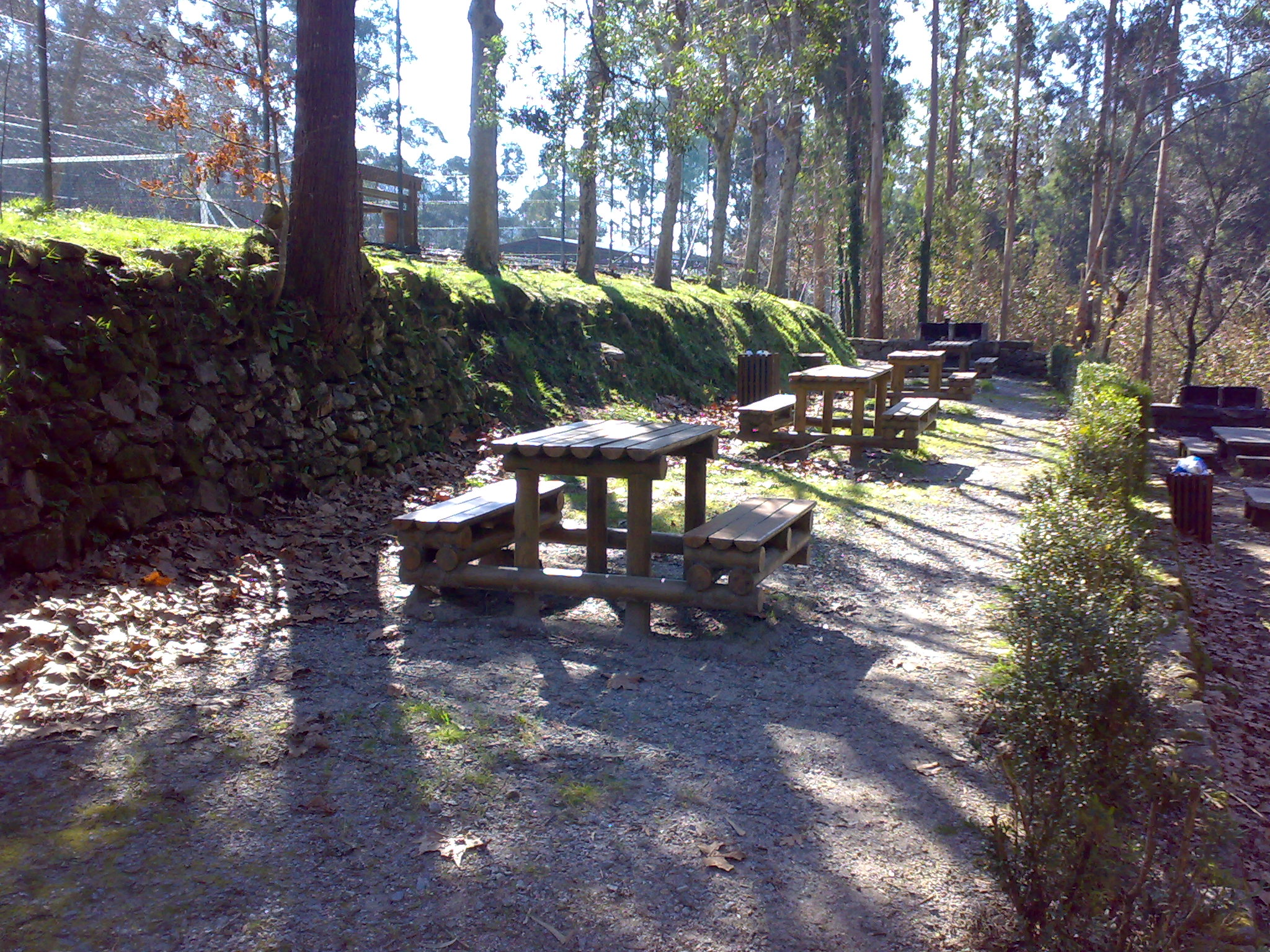
O Beque Picnic Area
- Saint Martin's Church (Igrexa de San Martiño), built in the 12th century, It is one of the best examples of the romanesque art in Galicia.
- Saint John of Tiran's Church, little church built on the period of transition from the late romanesque to the gothic art of the 13th century.
- Saint Eurlalia of Meira's Church , baroque church.
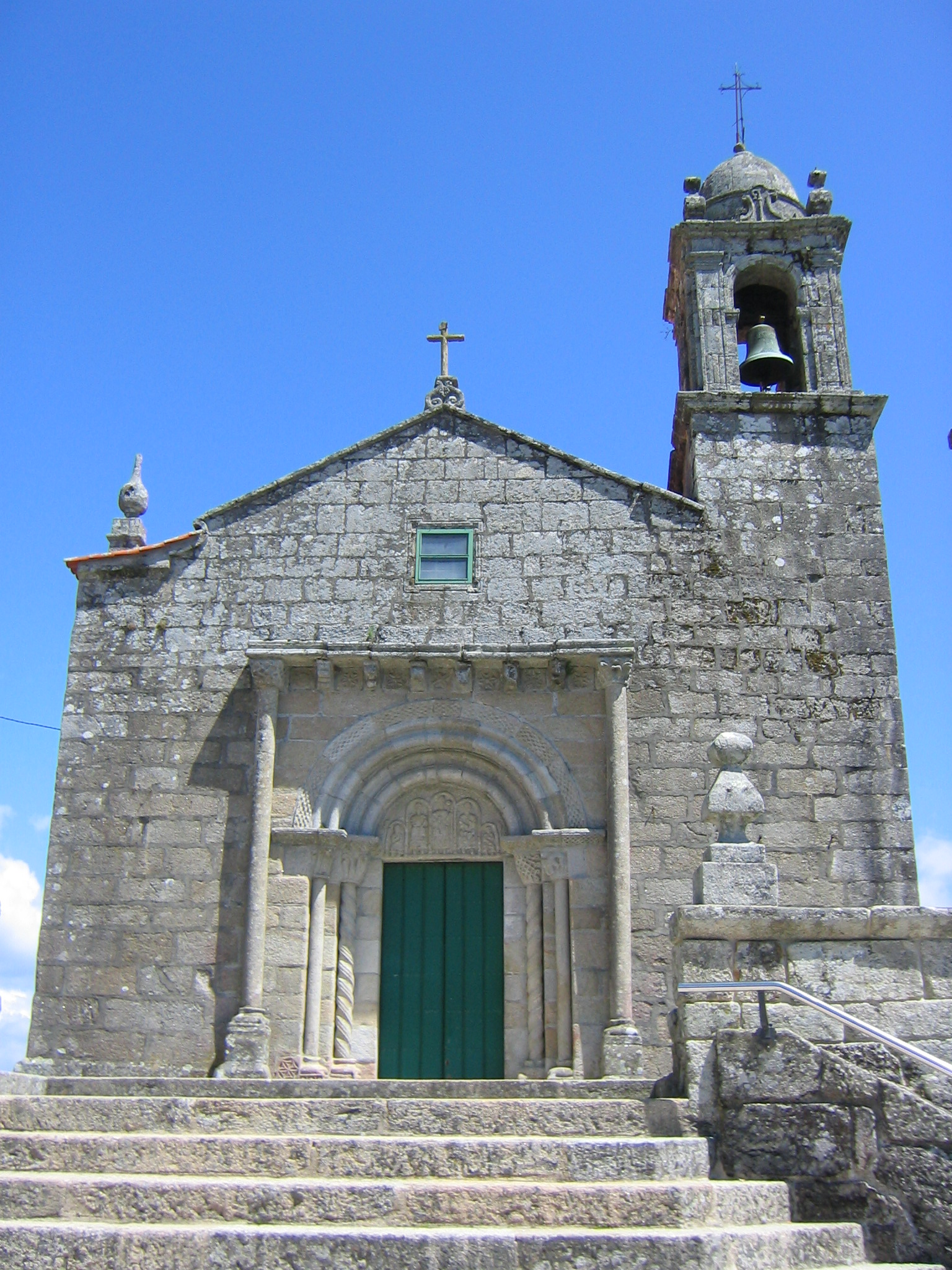
Saint Martins

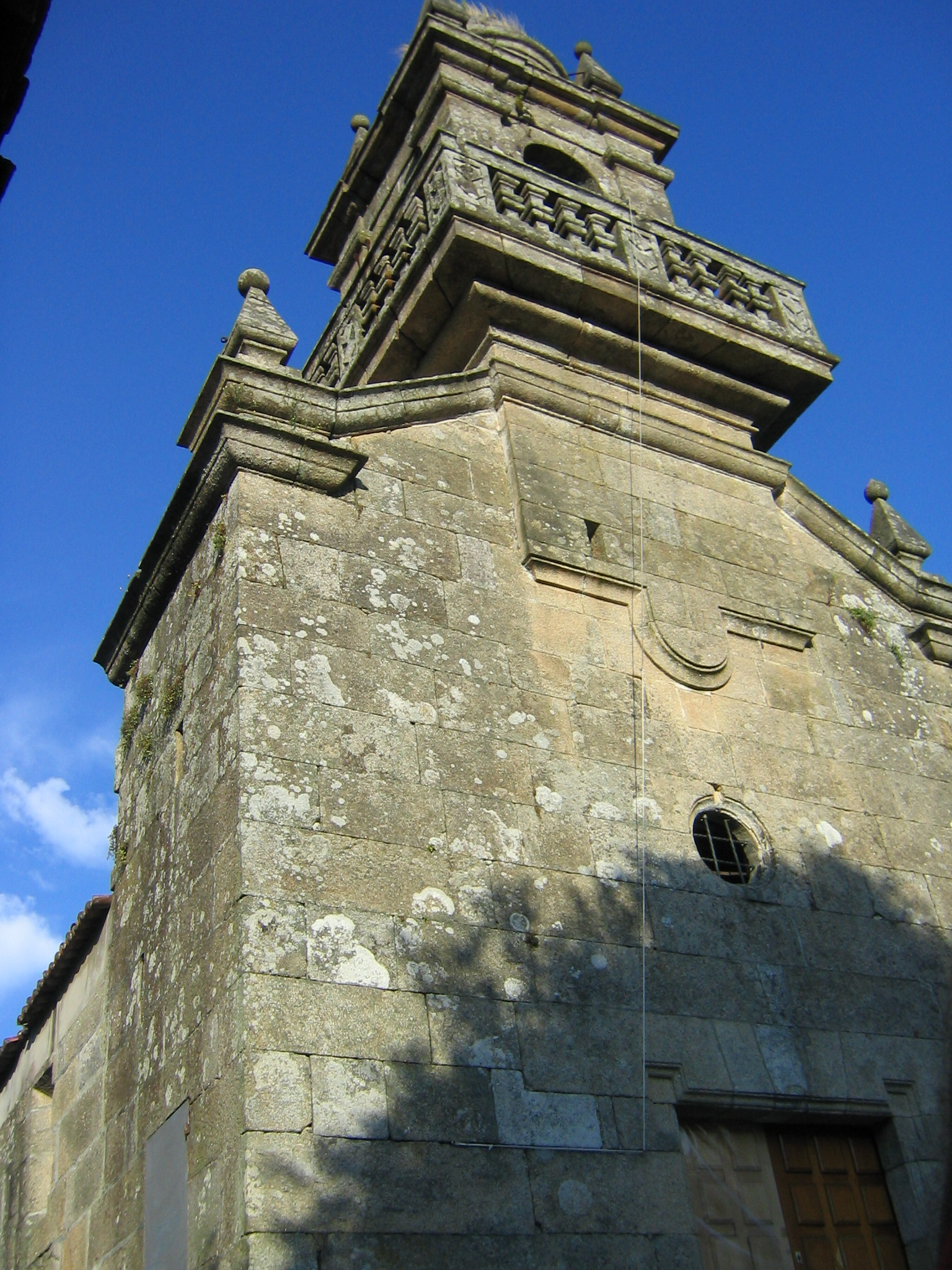
Saint Peter of Domaio

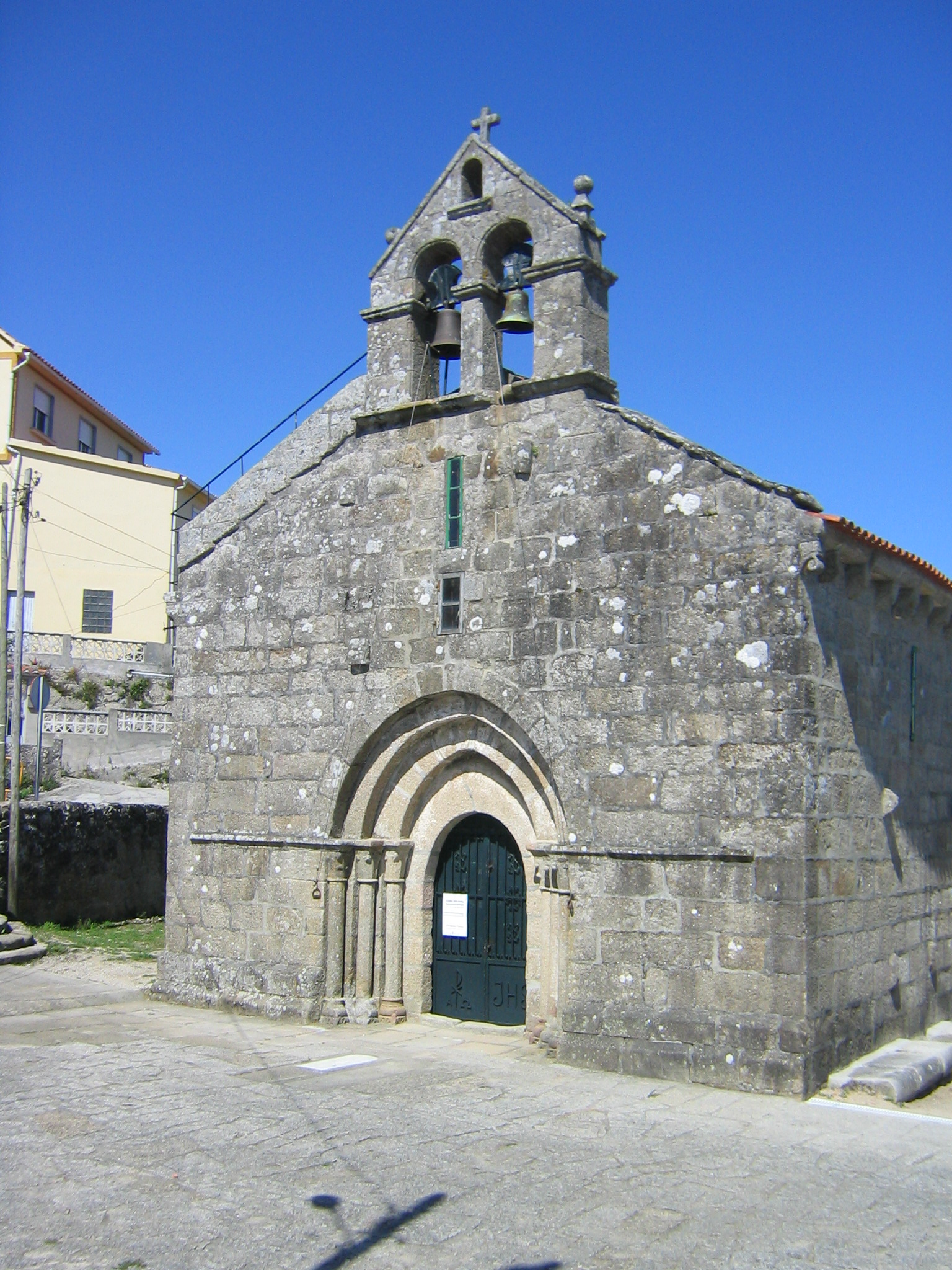
Saint John of Tirán
- Water Mill Route, where thirty one mills have been restored and integrated into this walk. It runs for 6 km through the river's bank which is covered by a lush Atlantic forest well preserved. Three of the water mills are still active.
Water Mill’s Route

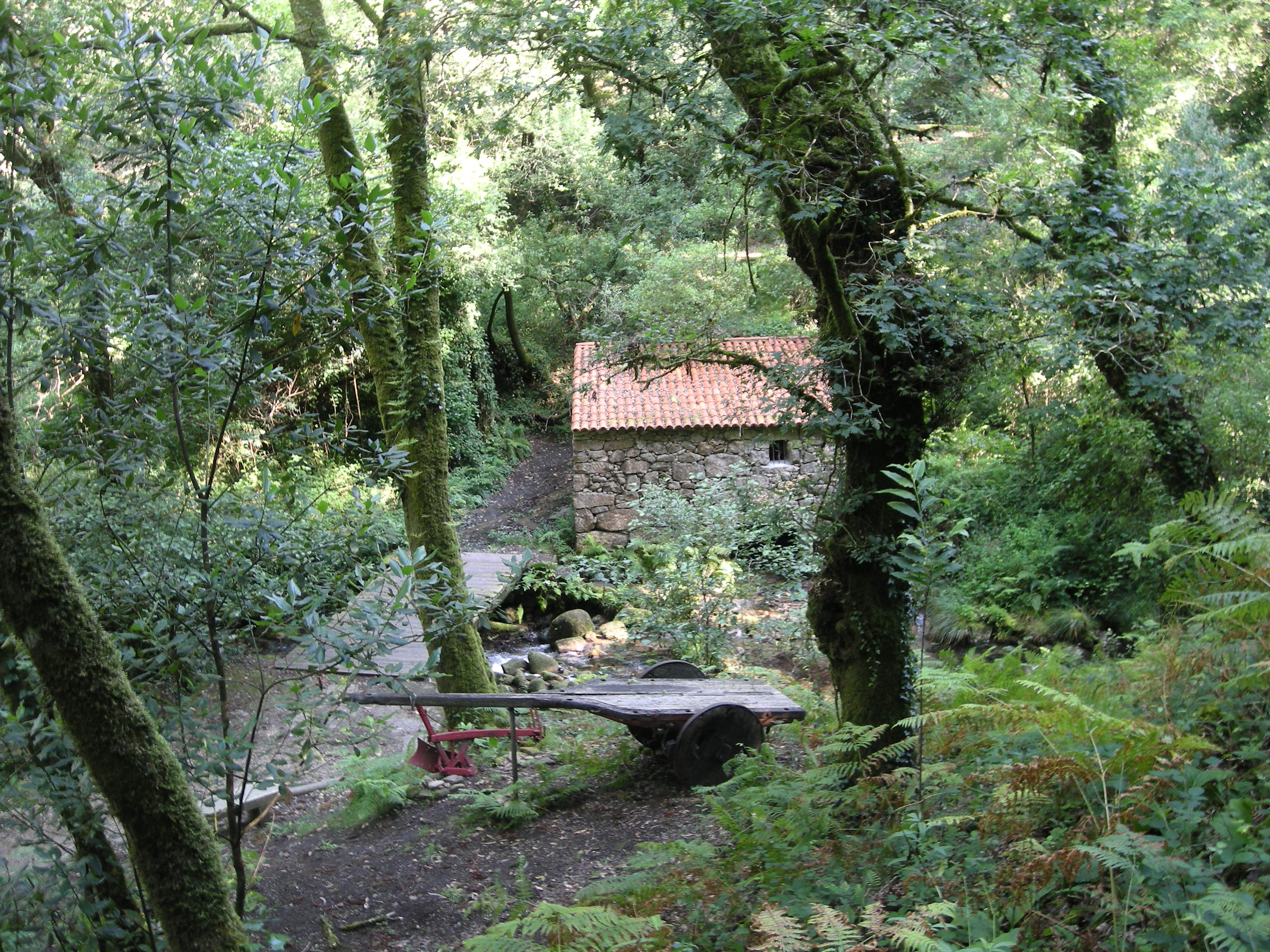
Water Mill

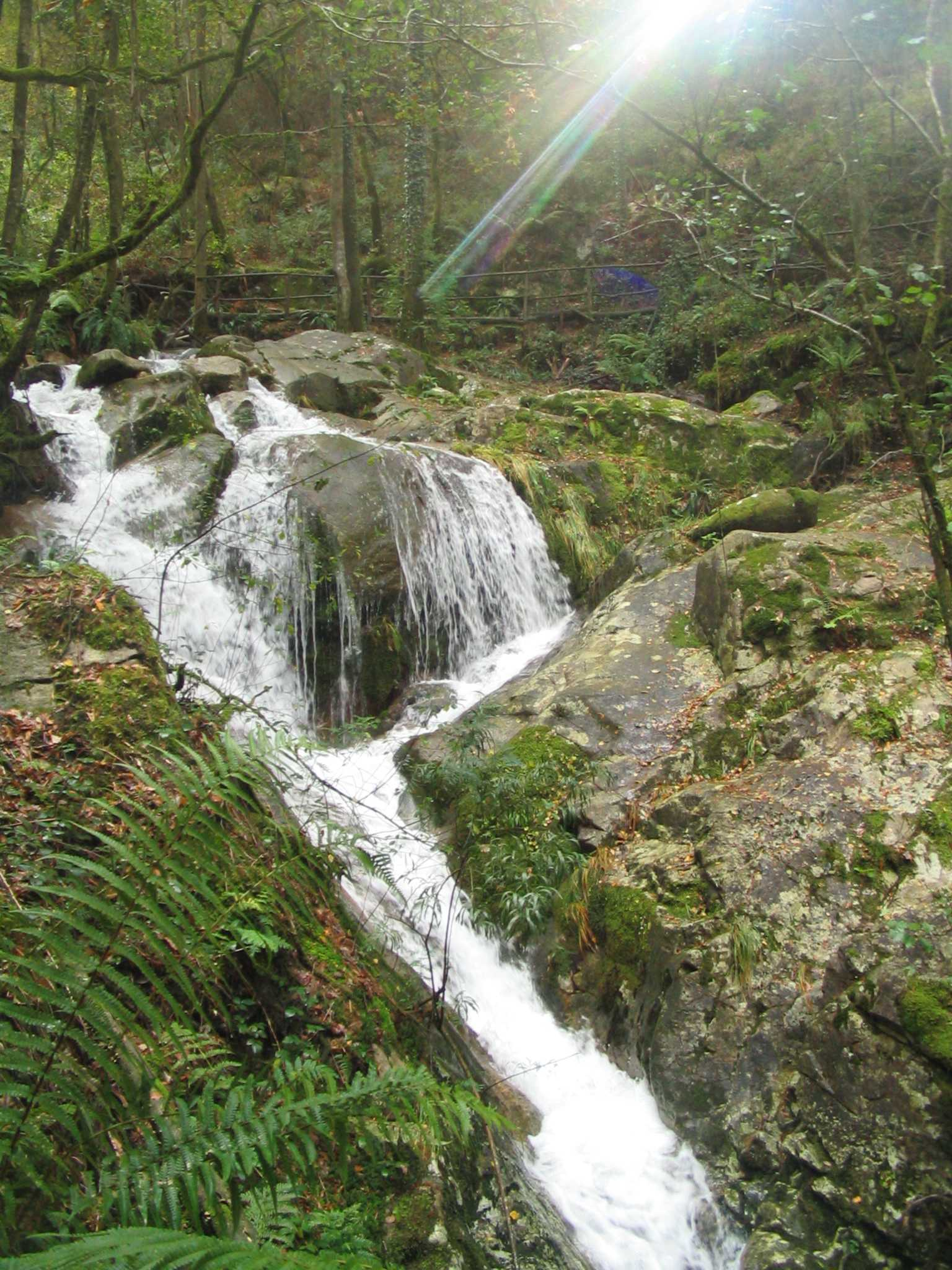
Fraga Stream

== Sports ==
Rowing is one of the most popular sports. There are two active rowing clubs, S.D. Samertolameu (Meira) and S.D. Tirán, who compete in the highest category. In 1960, a crew made up of the best rowers from both clubs, under the name of Moaña, won the Rowing Championship of Spain. After that, the S.D. Tirán won three more times this competition in 1961, 1996 and 1997.

== Sister cities ==
- (Spain) San Martín de Trevejo

== Parishes ==
- Domaio
- Meira
- Moaña
- Tirán

== Notable people from Moaña ==
- Casto Méndez Núñez, Spanish rear admiral
- Santiago Castroviejo, botanist
- Anxo Lorenzo, piper
- Jonathan Aspas, football player
- Iago Aspas, football player
- Dani Rivas, motorcycle racer

== Picture gallery ==
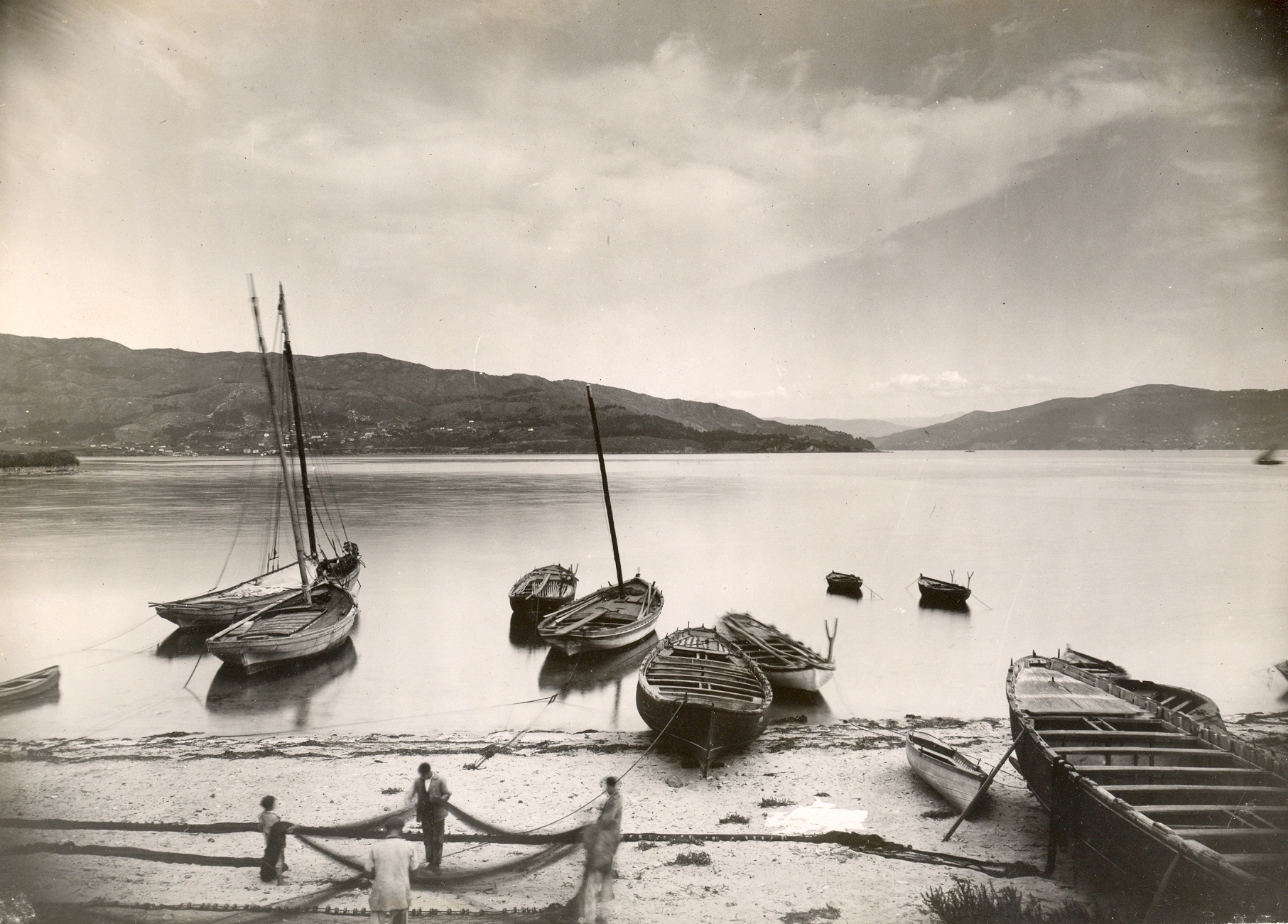
O Con Beach in 1920

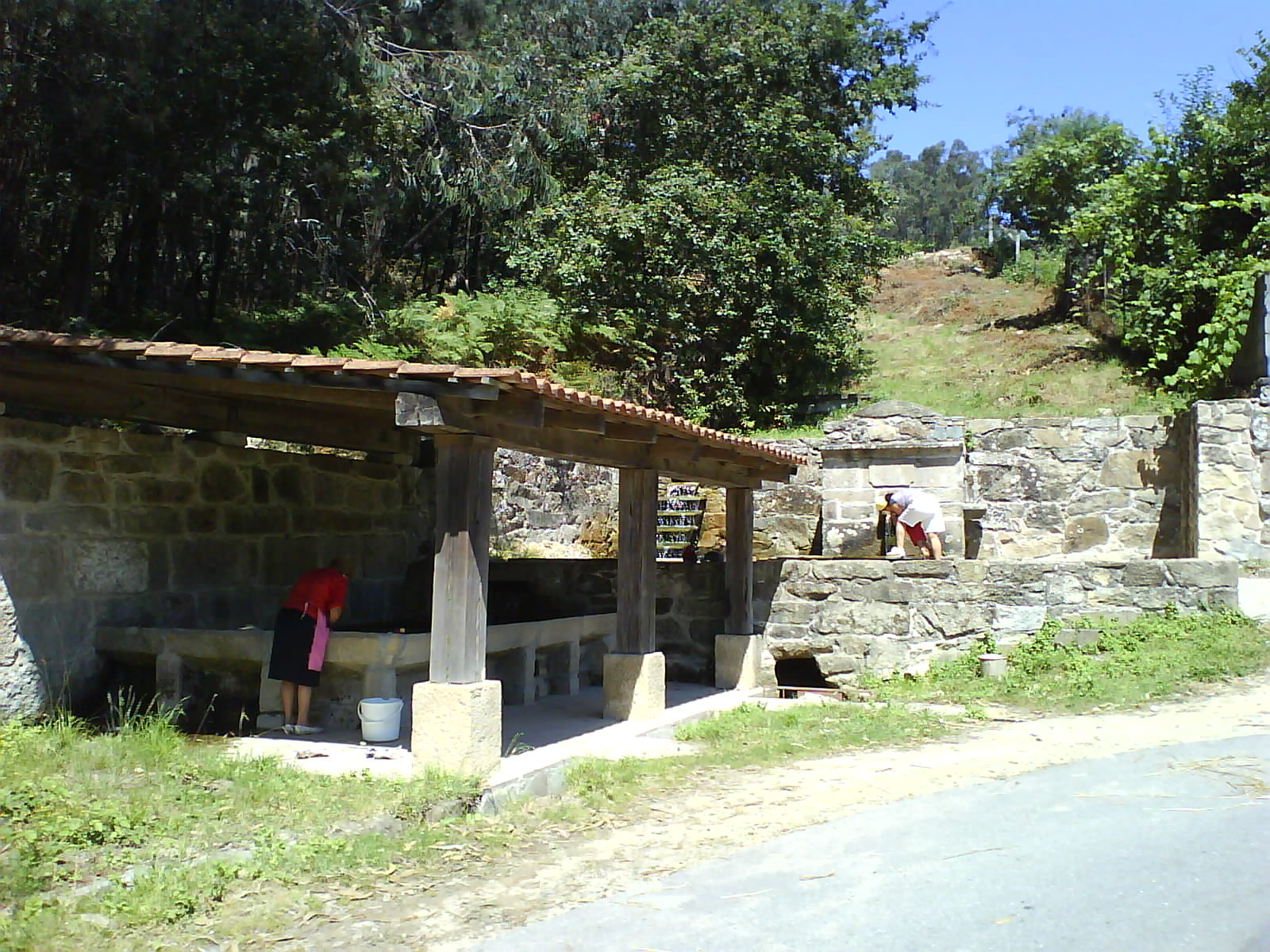
Public Fountain

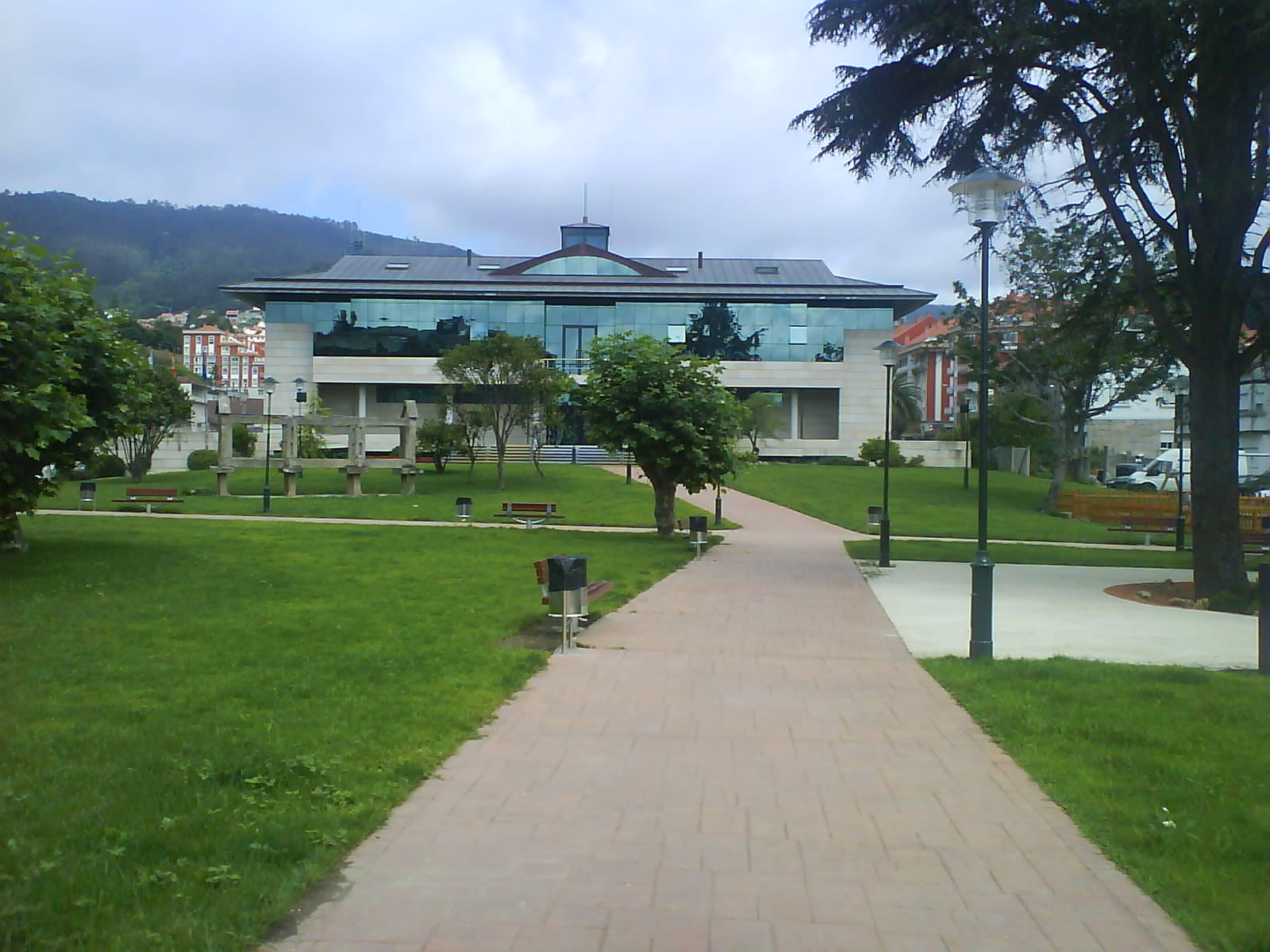
City Hall

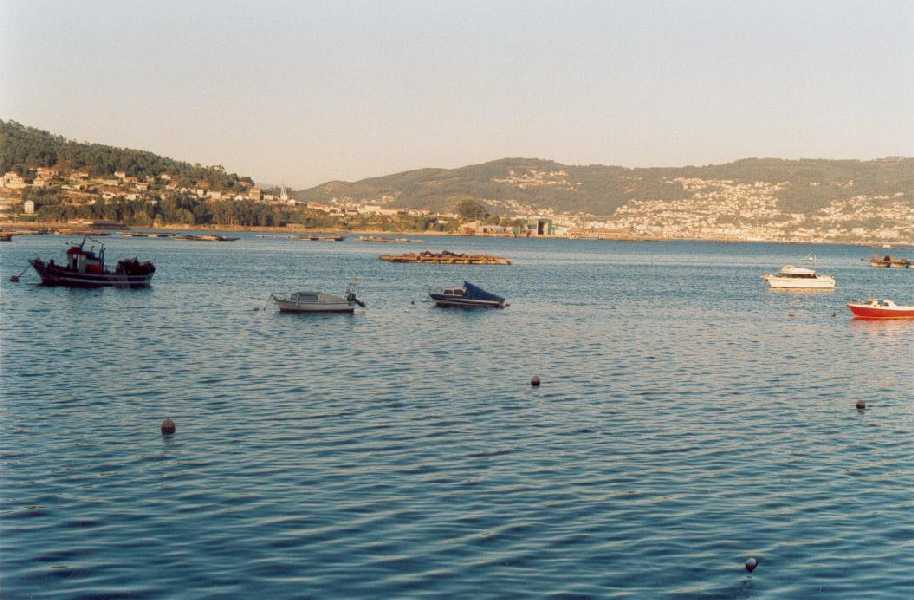
General View

== See also ==
- O Morrazo
- Rande Bridge
- Rías Baixas
- List of municipalities in Pontevedra
