= Interceltic Festival of Morrazo =

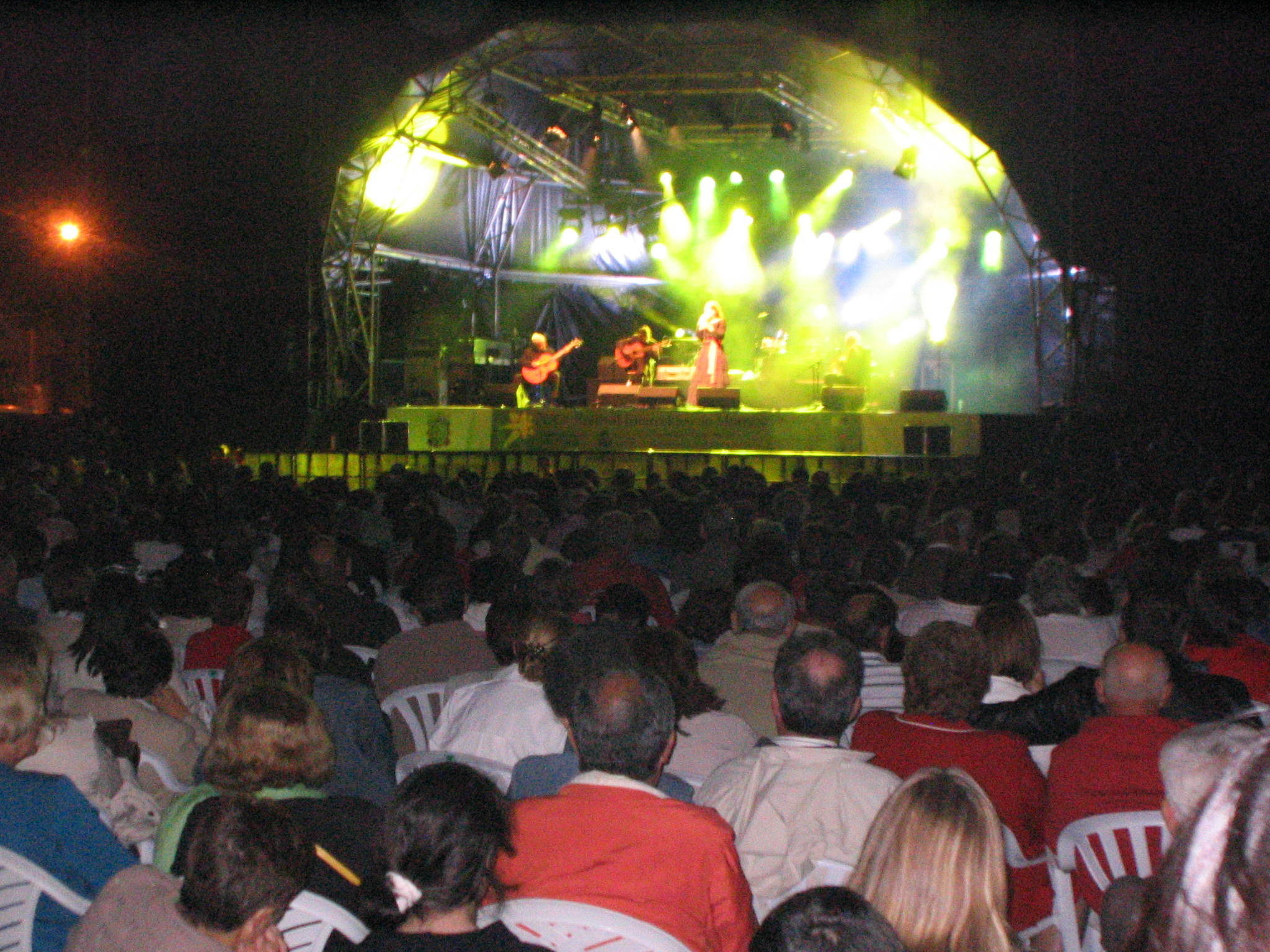
- Genre: Galician traditional music, folk music
- Dates: August each year
- Locations: Moaña, Spain
- Years active: 1985–present
- Founders: Semente Nova
- Website: festivalinterceltico.com

The Interceltic Festival of Morrazo is a folk music festival celebrated in August in Moaña in Galicia, Spain. The purpose of the festival is to promote and develop traditional folk music, highlighting Celtic music and new tendencies. The festival was founded on 15 August 1985 by the Semente Nova Bagpipes' School.

== See also ==
- Galician traditional music
