= List of Galician people =

This is a list of famous Galician people.

== Arts ==
- Delmi Álvarez, photographer
- Maruja Mallo (1902–1995), painter
- Mariano Grueiro (born 1975), activist, writer, photographer, filmmaker, artist
- Francisco Calvelo (born 1982), filmmaker
- Fernando Álvarez de Sotomayor y Zaragoza (1875–1960), painter
- Gregorio Fernández (1576–1636), Baroque sculptor
- Victor Moscoso (born 1936), Spanish-American artist
- Luís Seoane (1910–1979), lithographer and artist
- Isaac Díaz Pardo (1920–2012), artist and businessman

=== Actors ===
- María Casares (1922–1996)
- José Garcia (actor) (born 1966)
- Nancho Novo (born 1958)
- La Belle Otero (1868–1965), dancer, actress, and courtesan
- Fernando Rey (1917–1994)
- Martin Sheen a.k.a. Ramon Estevez (born 1940) (part Irish, part Galician)
- Charlie Sheen a.k.a. Carlos Estevez (born 1965) (father part Galician)
- Emilio Estevez (born 1962) (father part Galician)
- Luis Tosar (born 1971)
- Jesús Vázquez (born 1965)
- Paula Vázquez (born 1974)
- Pedro Alonso (born 1971)
- Dafne Keen (born 2005) (mother Galician)

=== Musicians ===
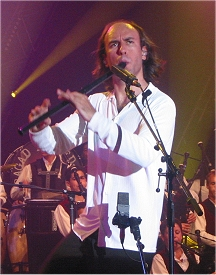
Carlos Núñez

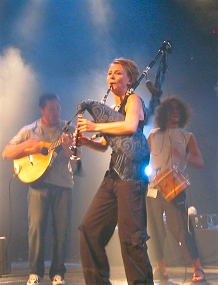
Susana Seivane

- Bernal de Bonaval (13th century), troubadour
- Avelino Cachafeiro (1899–1972), bagpiper
- Luz Casal (born 1958), singer
- Manu Chao (born 1961) (father from Vilalba), singer
- Martín Codax (fl. 13th and 14th centuries), medieval composer and performer
- Iván Ferreiro (born 1970), singer
- Fuxan Os Ventos, folk music group
- Jerry Garcia (1942–1995) (part Galician, part Irish and Swedish), founding member of American rock group The Grateful Dead
- Isabel Granada (born 1976) (mother from Ferrol), singer
- Enrique Iglesias (born 1975) (grandfather from Ourense), singer
- Julio Iglesias (born 1943) (father from Ourense), singer
- Carlos Leal (born 1969), Swiss rapper and actor born to Galician immigrants
- Xoel López, singer
- Anxo Lorenzo (born 1974), bagpiper
- Luar na Lubre, Celtic music group
- Mendinho (fl. 13th century), medieval troubadour
- Milladoiro, Celtic music group
- Carlos Núñez (born 1971), musician and bagpiper
- Natalia Oreiro (born 1977), singer
- Cristina Pato (born 1970), bagpiper
- Manuel Ramil (born 1978), power metal keyboardist
- Rosalía (born 1992), (father part Galician), singer
- Paulina Rubio (born 1971) (father from A Coruña), singer
- Marta Sánchez (born 1966) (both parents from A Coruña), singer
- Susana Seivane (born 1976), bagpiper
- C. Tangana (born 1990), (father from Vigo), rapper
- Siniestro Total, punk rock group
- Los Suaves, hard rock band
- Octavio Vázquez (born 1972), composer
- Oscar Rilo (born 1981), heavy metal singer

=== Writers ===
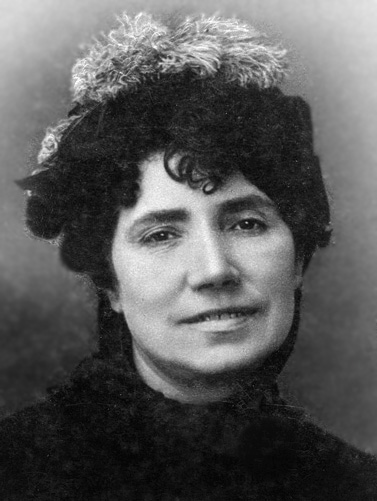
Rosalía de Castro

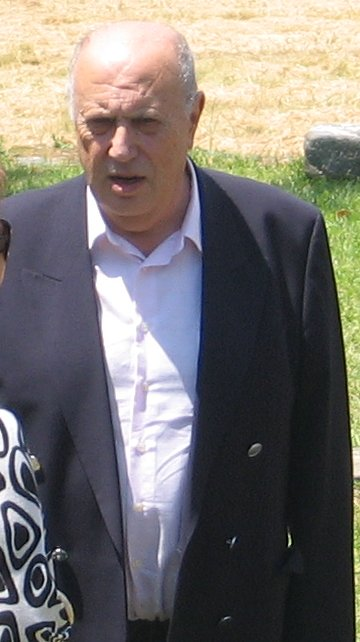
Xosé Luís Méndez Ferrín

- Marilar Aleixandre (born 1947)
- Concepción Arenal (1820–1893), writer and feminist
- Xela Arias (1962–2003)
- Eduardo Blanco Amor (1897–1979), writer and journalist
- Carmen Blanco (born 1954)
- Xurxo Borrazás (born 1963)
- Ana Isabel Boullón Agrelo (born 1962), linguist
- Ricardo Carvalho Calero (1910–1990)
- Yolanda Castaño (born 1977), poet
- Castelao (1886–1950), writer, politician, and painter
- Rosalía de Castro (1837–1885), writer
- Camilo José Cela (1916–2002), writer, Nobel Prize in Literature
- Ramón Chao (1935–2018)
- Álvaro Cunqueiro (1911–1981), writer and journalist
- Manuel Curros Enríquez (1851–1908), writer
- María Magdalena Domínguez (1922-2021), poet
- Estíbaliz Espinosa Río (born 1974), science poet and singer
- Benito Jerónimo Feijóo y Montenegro (1676–1764)
- Wenceslao Fernández Flórez (1885–1964)
- Agustín Fernández Mallo (born 1967)
- Celso Emilio Ferreiro (1912–1979)
- Xesús Ferro Ruibal (born 1944)
- Ricardo Flores Peres (1903–2002)
- Suso de Toro (born 1956), writer
- Béa González, (born 1962), writer
- Beremundo González Rodríguez (1909–1986)
- Juana Teresa Juega López (1885-1979), poet
- María López Sández (born 1973), philologist and essayist
- Salvador de Madariaga (1886–1978), diplomat, writer, historian, and pacifist
- Luis Mariñas (1947–2010), journalist
- María Mariño (1907–1967)
- Xosé Luís Méndez Ferrín (born 1938), writer, proposed for the Nobel Prize
- José María Merino (born 1941)
- Manuel Murguía (1833–1923)
- Xosé Neira Vilas (1928–2015)
- Olga Novo (born 1975)
- Albino Núñez Domínguez (1901–1974)
- Pilar Pallarés (born 1957), poet
- Emilia Pardo Bazán (1851–1921), writer and feminist
- Chus Pato (born 1955)
- Otero Pedrayo (1888–1976)
- Emma Pedreira (born 1978), writer
- Ánxeles Penas (born 1943), poet
- Eduardo Pondal (1835–1917)
- José María Posada (1817–1886)
- Luz Pozo Garza (1922-2020), poet
- Ignacio Ramonet (born 1943)
- Ismael Ramos (born 1994), writer
- Jacinto Rey (born 1972)
- Ofelia Rey Castelao (born 1956)
- Vicente Risco (1884–1963), writer and politician
- Manuel Rivas (born 1957), writer
- Juan Rodríguez de la Cámara (1390–1450)
- Claudio Rodriguez Fer (born 1956)
- Fátima Rodríguez (b. 1961), writer, translator, professor
- Luís Seoane (1910–1979)
- Gonzalo Torrente Ballester (1910–1999), writer
- Ramón del Valle-Inclán (1866–1936), writer
- Lorenzo Varela (1917–1978)
- Eva Veiga(born 1961), poet and journalist
- Martin Veiga (born 1970)
- Benito Vicetto Pérez (1824–1878)
- Darío Villanueva (born 1950), literary theorist and critic, director of the Real Academia Española
- Miguel Ángel Villar Pinto (born 1977)
- Antón Vilar Ponte (1881–1936)
- Luísa Villalta (1957-2004), writer

== Business ==
- José María Castellano Ríos (born 1947) is the former CEO and Deputy Chairman of the Inditex Group, which includes brand stores such as Zara, Massimo Dutti, and Bershka.
- Carmela Arias y Díaz de Rábago (1920–2009), first woman president of a bank in Spain
- Adolfo Dominguez
- Rosalia Mera, co-founder of the Inditex Group
- Amancio Ortega founder of global fashion manufacturing and retail chain Inditex
- Antonio M. Pérez (born 1947), Spanish-American businessman

== Exploration ==
- Pedro Madruga (fl. 1434–1506), navigator and explorer
- Juan de Betanzos, historical source on the Incan civilization
- João da Nova (1460-1509) navigator and explorer
- Vasco Núñez de Balboa, (1475–1519) (Galician noble from Balboa), explorer and conquistador, discoverer of the Pacific Ocean
- Luís Vaz de Torres (1565–1607), navigator and explorer, first European who saw Australia
- Álvaro de Mendaña de Neira (1542–1595), navigator and explorer, discoverer of Marquesas Islands and Salomon Islands
- Isabel Barreto (1567–1612), navigator and explorer, first female Admiral in history
- Rodrigo de Quiroga, conquistador, Royal Governor of Chile
- Pedro Sarmiento de Gamboa, explorer and historian
- Benito de Soto (1805-1830), pirate

== Military ==
- Ángel Castro y Argiz (1875–1956), father of Fidel and Raúl Castro
- Juan de Lángara (1736–1806), naval officer and Minister of Marine
- Pedro Mariño de Lobera (1528–1594), soldier and chronicler of the Arauco War
- Casto Méndez Núñez (1824–1869), admiral
- Patricio Montojo, naval commander at the Battle of Manila Bay
- Alonso Pita da Veiga (fl. 1513–1529), military officer
- Maria Pita, soldier
- Marshall de Marzo, general soldier, conquistador

== Nobility ==
- Manuel de Godoy y Álvarez de Faria Ríos (1767-1851) Prince of Spain, 1st Duke of Alcudia, 1st Duke of Sueca, 1st Secretary of State, 1st Baron of Mascalbo.
- Alfonso VII of León and Castile (1105–1157), King of Galicia, León, and Castile
- Alfonso X of Castile (1221–1284), King of Galicia and Castile
- Diego Sarmiento de Acuña, 1st Count of Gondomar (1567–1626), Spanish ambassador to England
- Fernán Pérez de Andrade (fl. 1356–1397), Galician knight
- Fernando de Andrade de las Mariñas (1477–1540), First Count of Andrade and Second of Vilalba, Lord of Pontedeume and Ferrol
- Fernando Pérez de Traba (1090–1155), count of the Crown of León
- Fernando Ruiz de Castro (fl. 1354–1377), nobleman of the House of Castro
- Fernando Ruiz de Castro Andrade y Portugal (1548–1601), nobleman, Viceroy of Naples
- Gaspar de Zúñiga, 5th Count of Monterrey (1560–1606), nobleman, Viceroy of New Spain
- Inês de Castro (1325–1355), noblewoman, consort of King Peter I of Portugal
- Manuel de Acevedo y Zúñiga (fl. 1628–1637), Viceroy of Naples
- Menendo González (fl. 997–1008), Duke of Galicia and Count of Portugal
- Pedro Fernández de Castro y Andrade (1560–1622), nobleman, Viceroy of Naples
- Sueiro Gomes de Soutomaior (1417–1490), aristocrat in the kingdom of Galicia
- Vímara Peres (820–873), first ruler of the County of Portugal

== Politics ==
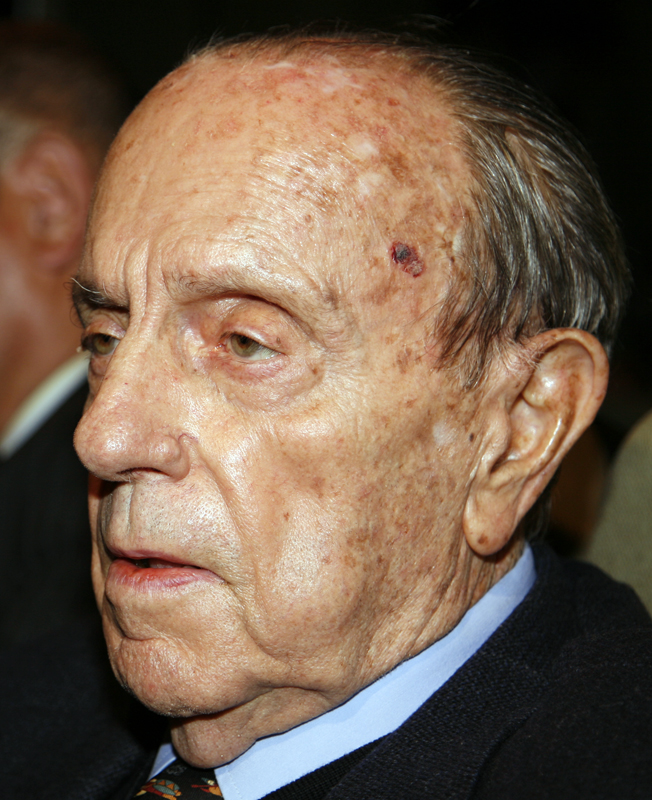
Manuel Fraga

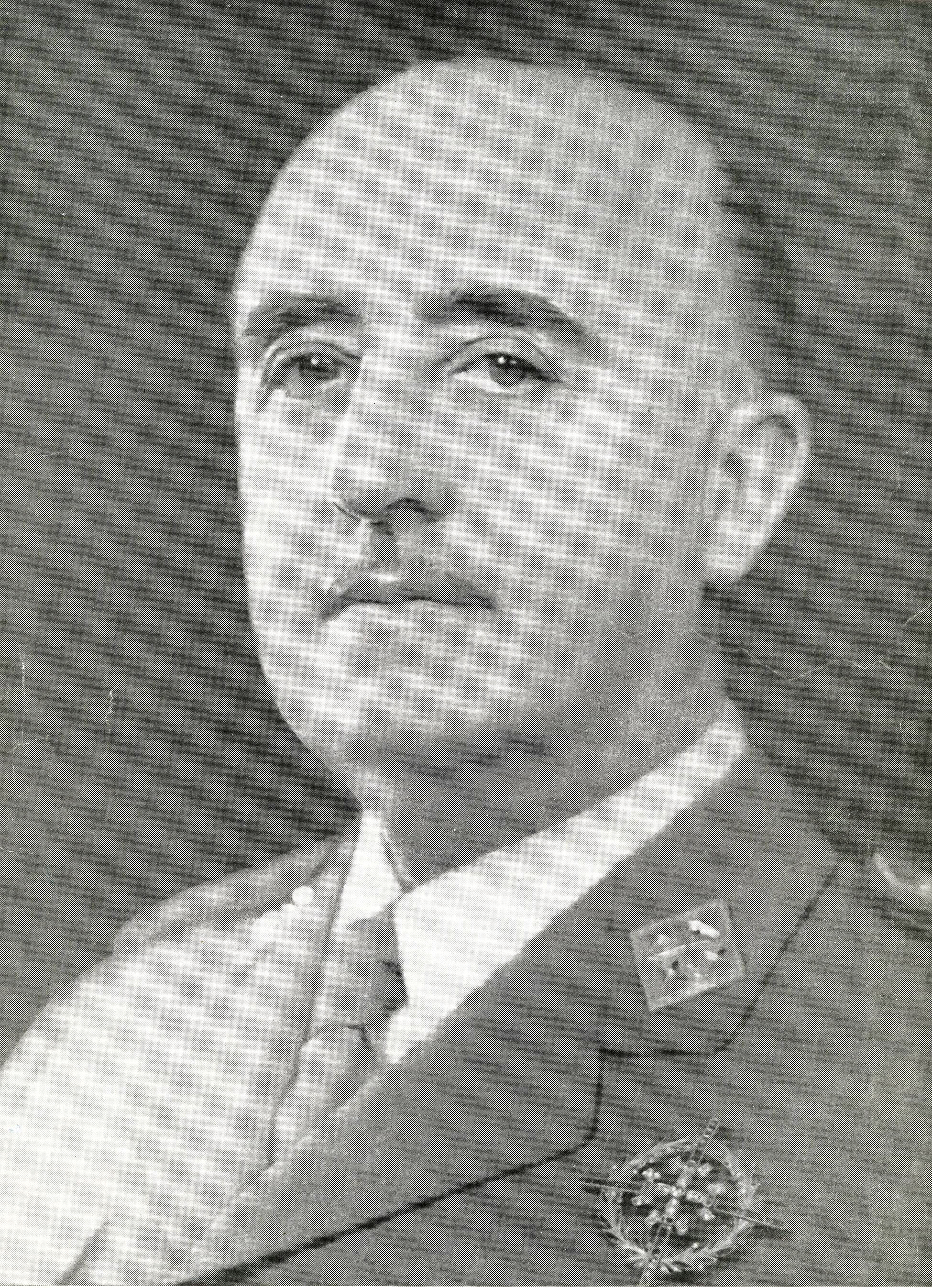
Francisco Franco

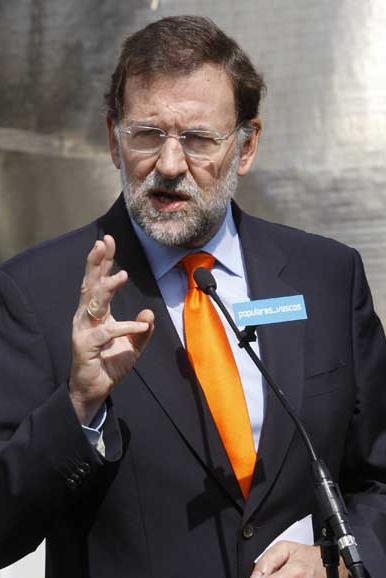
Mariano Rajoy

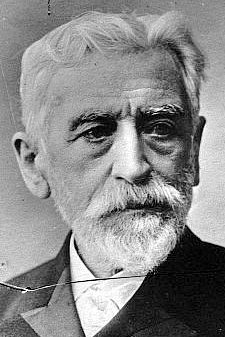
Eugenio Montero Ríos

- Santiago Iglesias, labor leader & organizer in Cuba & Puerto Rico born in A Coruña. First Spaniard elected in 1932 & 1936 to the U. S. Congress as Resident Commissioner from Puerto Rico
- Nadia Calviño
- Fidel Castro (both parents from Galicia), former president of Cuba
- Raúl Castro (both parents from Galicia), former president of Cuba, incumbent first secretary of the Communist Party of Cuba
- Pablo Iglesias, founder of the Socialist Workers' Party (PSOE) in 1879 and the Spanish General Workers' Union (UGT) in 1888
- Tabaré Vázquez (of Galician ancestry), president of Uruguay
- Francisco Franco, leader and later formal head of state of Spain from October 1936, and of all of Spain from 1939 until his death in 1975
- Manuel Fraga Iribarne, President of the Xunta of Galicia from 1990 to 2005 and founder of the People's Alliance (Spain) (Alianza Popular - AP), later refounded as the People's Party (Spain) (Partido Popular - PP).
- Anxo Quintana, politician, former leader of the Galician Nationalist Block (Bloque Nacionalista Galego), the main Galician Nationalist party
- Adolfo Suárez González (his father was from La Coruña), Spain's first democratically elected prime minister after the end of Francoist Spain
- Xosé Manuel Beiras, politician, economist, writer and intellectual
- Benigno Álvares, leader and founder of Galician Communist Party
- Alexandre Bóveda
- Yolanda Díaz
- Elena Espinosa, Minister of the Environment and currently represents Ourense in the Spanish Congress
- Amada Garcia, Communist activist
- Francisco Caamaño Domínguez (born 1963)
- Rosario Hernández Diéguez, newspaper hawker and trade unionist affiliated with UGT and PSOE
- José Patiño (1666–1736), secretary of state
- Ricardo Mella, writer, intellectual and libertarian activist
- Alberto Núñez Feijóo
- Emilio Pérez Touriño, politician and economist
- Mariano Rajoy, leader of the conservative People's Party (PP) and prime minister of Spain until a vote of no confidence ousted his government
- Alfonso Daniel Rodríguez Castelao, writer, politician and one of the main symbols of Galician nationalism
- Elena Salgado, former Second Vice President and Minister of Economy and Finance in Spain
- Juan Niño de Tabora, former governor of the Philippines.
- Ramón Franco, pioneer of aviation, a political figure and brother of later caudillo Francisco Franco
- Juan Camilo Mouriño, politician
- Manolo Sánchez personal valet to the 37th president of the United States Richard Nixon.
- Enrique Líster Forján, a communist politician and military, serving as a general in the armies of the Spanish Republic, the Soviet Red Army and the Yugoslav People's Army
- José Calvo Sotelo (1893–1936), leader of the opposition, his assassination by Socialists agents marked the outbreak of the Spanish civil war
- Eugenio Montero Ríos (1832–1914), prime minister of Spain (19th century)
- José Canalejas (1854- 1912), prime minister of Spain (20th century)
- Manuel Portela Valladares (1868–1952) prime minister of Spain (20th century)
- Eduardo Dato e Iradier (1856–1921), prime minister of Spain (20th century, 3 times)
- Santiago Casares Quiroga, Prime Minister of Spain when Spanish civil war broke out

== Religion ==
- Alonso III Fonseca (1475–1534), Catholic archbishop and politician
- Antonio María Rouco Varela (born 1936), Catholic prelate
- Benito Jerónimo Feijoo e Montenegro, neoclassical monk and scholar
- Diego Gelmírez (1069–1149), Catholic archbishop
- Hydatius (400–469), Catholic bishop
- Marina of Aguas Santas (119–139), Portuguese Catholic saint
- Pope Damasus I (305–384)
- Rudesind (907–977), Catholic bishop and abbot
- Senorina (fl. 982), Catholic abbess
- Theodemar of Iria (fl. 818–847), Catholic bishop

== Sportspeople ==
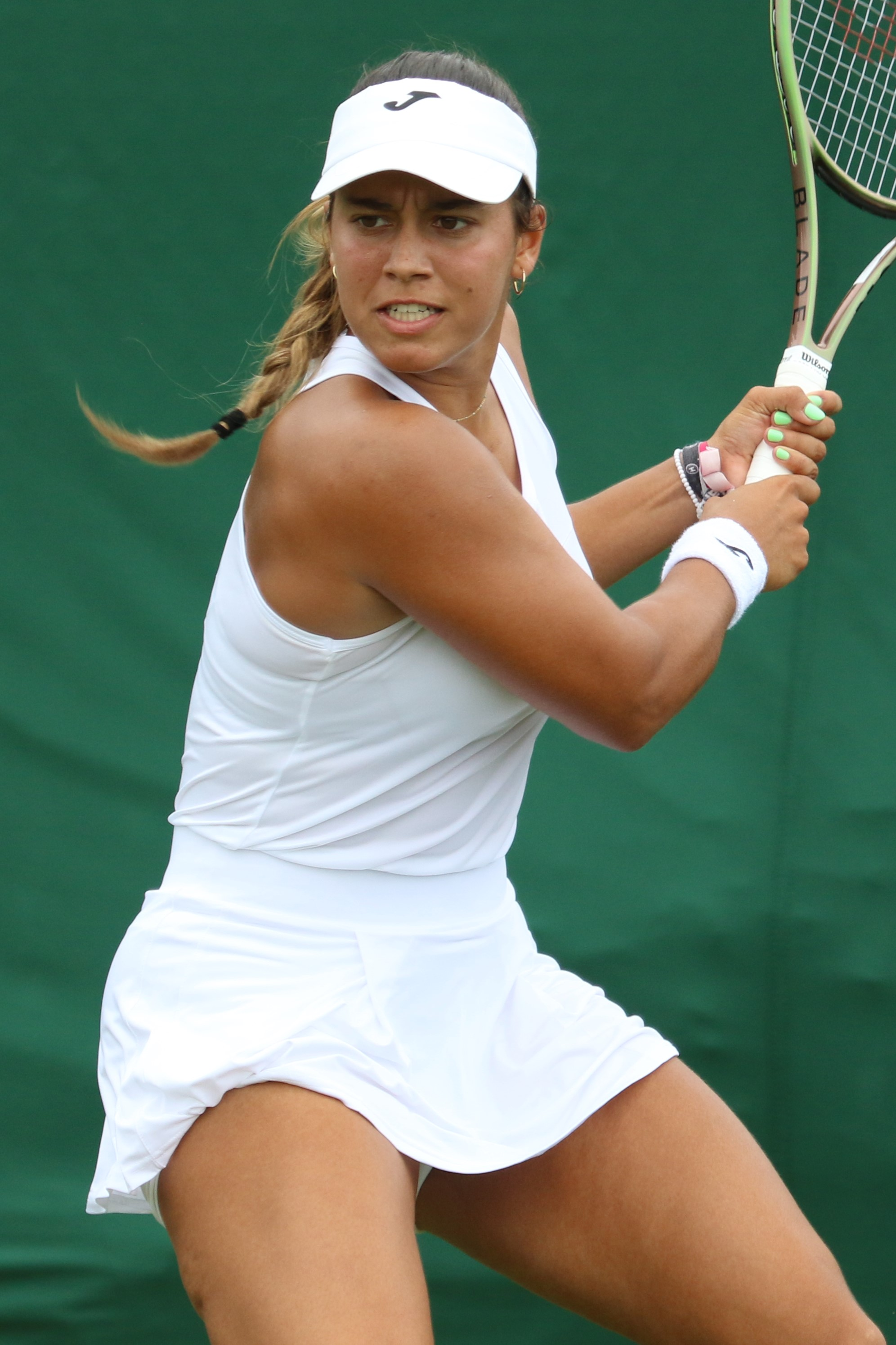
Jéssica Bouzas Maneiro

- Jéssica Bouzas Maneiro (born 2002), tennis player
- David Cal (born 1982), flatwater canoer
- Támara Echegoyen (born 1984), sailor
- Beatriz Gómez Cortés (born 1994), Olympic swimmer
- Francisco Javier Gómez Noya (born 1983), triathlete
- Juan López Mella (1965–1995), motorcycle racer
- Ana Peleteiro (born 1995), triple jumper, 2020 Olympic bronze medallist
- Carlos Pérez (born 1979), flatwater canoer
- Iván Raña (born 1979), triathlete
- Fran Vázquez (born 1983), basketball player

=== Cycling ===
- Gustavo César (born 1980)
- David García Dapena (born 1977)
- Vicente López Carril (born 1942)
- Ezequiel Mosquera (born 1975)
- Óscar Pereiro (born 1977), winner of the 2006 Tour de France
- Álvaro Pino (born 1956)
- Gonzalo Rabuñal (born 1984)
- Delio Rodríguez (1916–1994), winner of the 1945 Vuelta a España
- Emilio Rodríguez (1923–1984), winner of the 1950 Vuelta a España

=== Football ===
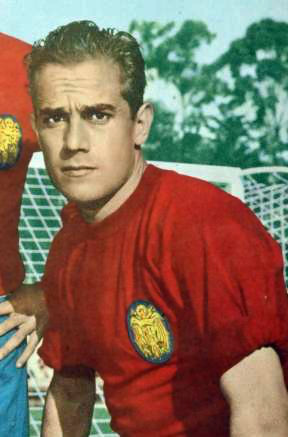
Luis Suárez Miramontes

- Amancio Amaro (born 1939), former Spanish international, 1964 European Championship winner
- Iago Aspas (born 1987), Spanish international
- Verónica Boquete (born 1987), Spanish women's international
- Paco Buyo (born 1958), former Spanish international
- Ricardo Cabanas (born 1979), former Swiss international
- Fran (born 1969), former Spanish international
- Jorge Otero (born 1969), former Spanish international
- Joselu (born 1990), Spanish international
- Pahiño (born 1923), former Spanish international
- Míchel Salgado (born 1975), former Spanish international
- Luis Suárez (born 1935), former Spanish international, 1964 European Championship winner, Ballon d'Or winner
- Lucas Vázquez (born 1991), Spanish international

== Others ==
- Ana Romero Masiá (born 1952), Galician historian
- Benito de Soto (1805–1830), pirate
- Ramón Menéndez Pidal (1869–1968), philologist and historian
- Antonio Palacios (1872–1945), architect
- Domingo de Andrade (1639–1712), Baroque architect
- Simón Rodríguez (1769–1854), philosopher and educator
