= Royal Galician Academy =

Cultural institution for the Galician language in A Coruña, Galicia, Spain

- Real Academia Galega
- Abbreviation: RAG
- Formation: August 30, 1906; 120 years ago
- Headquarters: A Coruña, Galicia, Spain
- Region served: Galicia
- Official language: Galician
- President: Víctor Fernández Freixanes
- Budget: €700,000
- Staff: 28
- Website: www.academia.gal

The Royal Galician Academy (Galician: Real Academia Galega, RAG) is an institution dedicated to the study of Galician culture and especially the Galician language; it promulgates norms of grammar, spelling, and vocabulary and works to promote the language. The Academy is based in A Coruña, Galicia, Spain. The incumbent president, since 2017, is Víctor Fernández Freixanes.

The RAG is the institition who promulgates the official, Spanish-based spelling for the Galician language, opposed to the reintegrationist, Portuguese-based spelling promulgated by the Galician Language Association.

== History ==
The Sociedade Protectora da Academia Gallega was founded in La Habana, Cuba in 1905. The following year, thanks to the efforts of writers Manuel Curros Enríquez and Xosé Fontenla Leal, on 30 September 1906, it was reestablished as the Real Academia Galega, with Manuel Murguía as its first president.

In 1972 the Academy standardized the design of the coat of arms of the Kingdom of Galicia. Some years later, the Academy persuaded the Galician government to commemorate the old coat of arms by superimposing it on the existing civil flag; the resulting flag is used today. Its terminological branch is Termigal.

During the presidency of Domingo García-Sabell (1977–1997), an agreement was reached with the Instituto da Lingua Galega on the orthographic and morphological standards of the Galician language (1982), which unified the various normative proposals that existed at the time. The Royal Galician Academy was officially recognized as the normative authority for Galician through the Language Normalization Law of 1983.

Likewise, various seminars and specialized sections were established, including the Lexicography Seminar (1983), the Sociolinguistics Seminar (1990), which was responsible for the Sociolinguistic Map of Galicia, as well as the Terminology Seminar, the Grammar Seminar (2000), and the Onomastics Seminar (2001).

During the presidency of Francisco Fernández del Riego (1997–2001), the institution began a process of greater openness and modernization. Under the leadership of Xosé Ramón Barreiro Fernández (2001–2010), efforts were made to computerize the documentary holdings, and in 2003 the orthographic and morphological standards of Galician were revised.

Between 2010 and 2013, the presidency was held by Xosé Luís Méndez Ferrín, and between 2013 and 2017 by Xesús Alonso Montero. From 2017 until 2025, the president was Víctor Fernández Freixanes, who was replaced in April 2025 by Henrique Monteagudo.

In 2012, the Royal Galician Academy (RAG) launched its online dictionary, containing more than 50,000 terms and including pronunciation. Until then, the main Galician dictionary available on the Internet had been Digalego, which was initially a paid service and was made freely available by the Government of Galicia in 2016.

== Current members ==
- Víctor Fernández Freixanes
- Margarita Ledo Andión
- Fina Casalderrey
- Marilar Aleixandre
- Xosé Henrique Monteagudo Romero
- Xesús Alonso Montero
- Rosario Álvarez Blanco
- Xosé Luís Axeitos Agrelo
- Ana Isabel Boullón Agrelo
- Francisco Díaz-Fierros Viqueira
- Francisco Fernández Rei
- Xesús Ferro Ruibal
- Salvador García-Bodaño Zunzunegui
- Manuel González González
- Bernardino Graña Villar
- María López Sández
- Ramón Lorenzo Vázquez
- Chus Pato
- Xosé Luís Regueira Fernández
- Manuel Rivas
- Euloxio Rodríguez Ruibal
- Ana Romaní
- Pegerto Saavedra Fernández
- Anton Luís Santamarina Fernández
- Andrés Torres Queiruga
- Ramón Villares Paz
