= Ruibal =

Surname list

Rubial is the surname of the following people

- Aitor Ruibal (born 1996), Spanish footballer
- Javier Ruibal (born 1955), Spanish musician and songwriter
- Jorge Ruibal (born 1945), Uruguayan lawyer and judge
- Víctor Manuel Liceaga Ruibal (1935–2012), Mexican politician
- Xesús Ferro Ruibal (born 1944), Spanish theologian and Latinist
