= Xosé Ramón Barreiro =

Spanish historian (1936–2021)

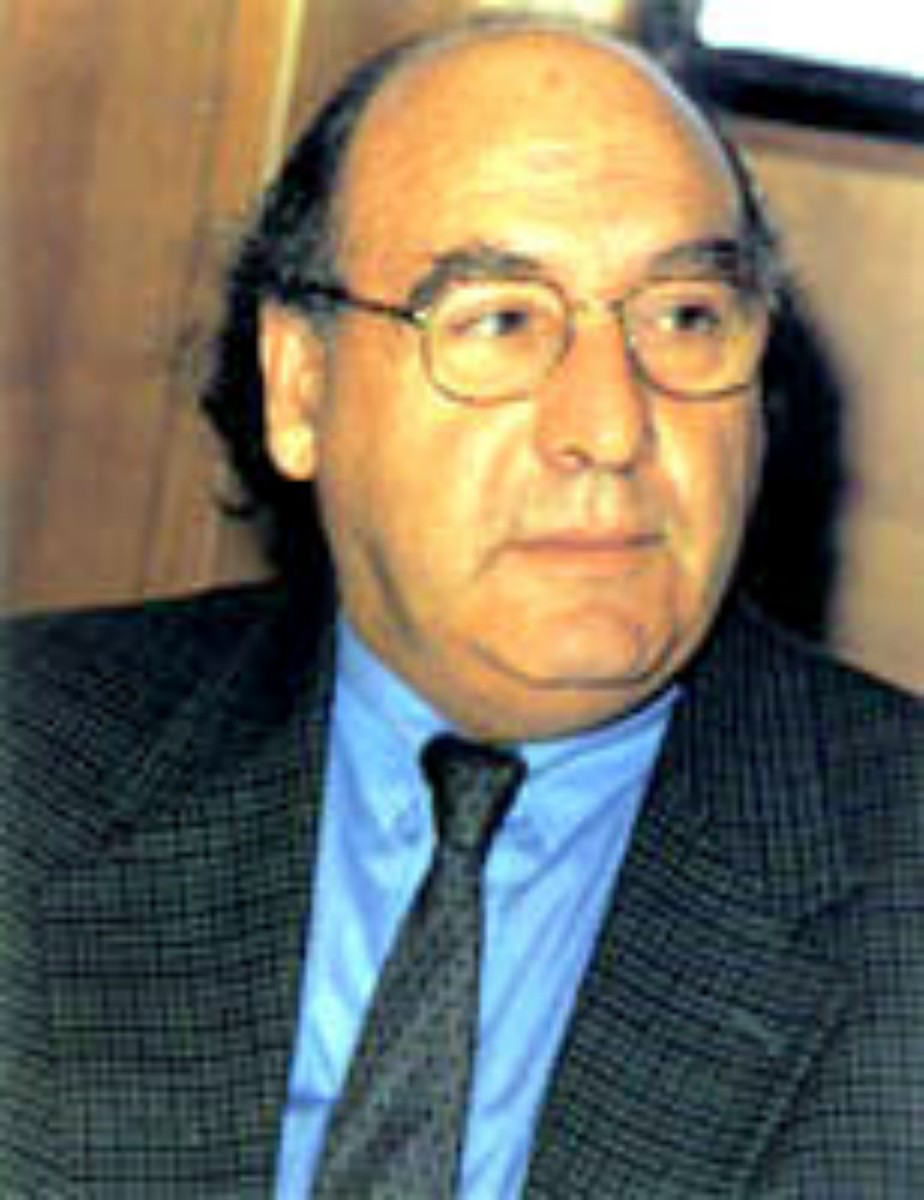

Xosé Ramón Barreiro Fernández (2 December 1936 – 17 March 2021) was a Spanish historian. He was president of the Royal Galician Academy from 2001 to 2009.
