= Termigal =

Termigal is the body in charge of the general coordination of terminology activities in relation to the Galician language, of promoting and developing terminological resources and products of linguistic engineering in which terminology plays an important role. It was created in 1997 out of an agreement between Royal Galician Academy (as the academic authority in charge of sanctioning the spelling rules for Galician language) and the Linguistic Planning Agency of the Galician government (as an independent body with competence in linguistic policy issues). It currently tries to establish the technical terms for Galician language, namely:

- they develop glossaries for a wide range of domains of knowledge.
- they provide consulting services by phone or mail to translators, terminologists, etc.
