= Mingote =

The Most Excellent Antonio Mingote 1st Marquess of Daroca
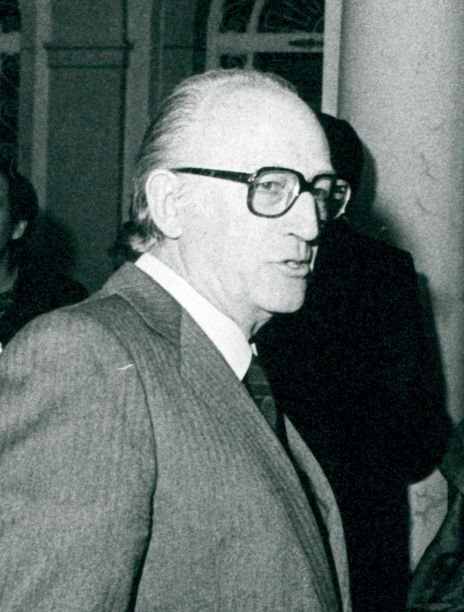
- Mingote in 1981
- Born: Ángel Antonio Mingote Barrachina; 17 January 1919; Sitges (Barcelona), Spain
- Died: 3 April 2012 (aged 93); Madrid, Spain
- Occupations: cartoonist, writer and journalist

Seat r of the Real Academia Española
- In office 20 November 1988 (Note: Elected on 22 January 1987) – 26 December 2020
- Preceded by: Seat established
- Succeeded by: Santiago Muñoz Machado

Ángel Antonio Mingote Barrachina, 1st Marquess of Daroca (17 January 1919 – 3 April 2012), also simply known as Mingote, was a Spanish cartoonist, writer and journalist. He drew a daily cartoon in ABC since 1953 until his death in 2012.

== Biography ==
He was born in Sitges, Barcelona, Spain.

== Honors ==
On 1 December 2011, Mingote was raised into the Spanish nobility by King Juan Carlos I with the hereditary title of Marquess of Daroca (Spanish: Marqués de Daroca).

== Death ==
He died in Madrid.

== Awards ==
- 1961: Cruz de Caballero de la Orden de Isabel la Católica
- 1967: Premio Mingote
- 1976: Premio Ondas
- 1979: Premio Juan Palomo, Larra y Víctor de la Serna
- 1980: Premio Nacional de Periodismo
- 1988: Premio iberoamericano de humor gráfico "Quevedos"
- 1988: Medalla de Oro al Mérito Artístico
- 1989: Premio a la Transparencia (ANFEVI)
- 1995: Medalla de Oro del Ayuntamiento de Madrid
- 1996: Medalla de Oro al Mérito en el Trabajo
- 1997: Cruz de plata de la Guardia civil
- 1998: Cartero Honorario de España
- 1999: Pluma de oro de El Club de la Escritura
- 2001: Premio "Personalidad"
- 2002: Premio Luca de Tena
- 2005: Doctor Honoris Causa por la Universidad de Alcalá de Henares
- 2007: Doctor Honoris Causa por la Universidad Rey Juan Carlos
- Award Gato Perich
- Gold Medal of Fine Arts

== Books ==
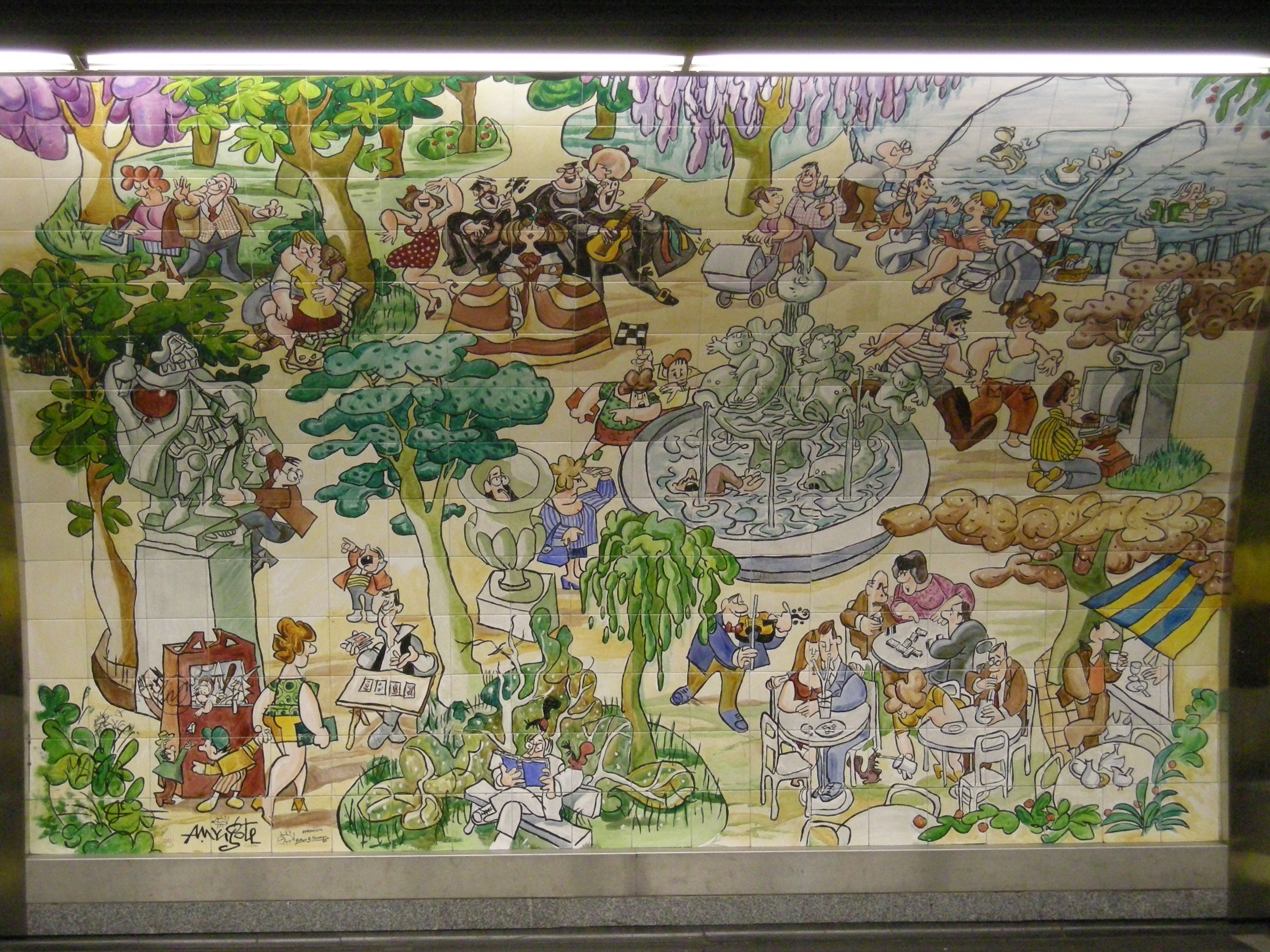
Mural drawn by Mingote in 1987 at the Retiro station in the Madrid underground

1. El conde sisebuto
2. Historia de la gente
3. Historia de Madrid
4. Historia del traje
5. Hombre solo
6. Hombre atónito
7. Historia del mus
8. Las palmeras de cartón
9. Mi primer Quijote
10. Patriotas adosados

== Notes ==
Spanish nobility
New creation	Marquess of Daroca; 2011–2012	Succeeded by Pablo Mingote Fernández
