= Xesús Alonso Montero =

Spanish writer (1928–2026)

Xesús Alonso Montero (28 November 1928 – 12 February 2026) was a Spanish writer and specialist in Galician literature.

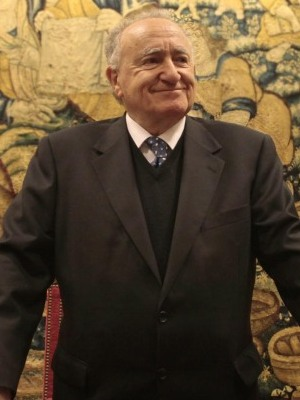
Montero in 2013

== Early life and career ==
Alonso Montero was born in Vigo on 28 November 1928. Throughout his career, he authored a number of works, primarily focusing on Galician history.

He was the president of Royal Galician Academy (2013–2017).

== Personal life and death ==
In 1958 Alonso Montero married his former classmate, Emilia Pimentel Iglesias in Madrid. With Pimentel he had three children, Emilio, Xesús, and Sara. In 1984 Alonso and Pimentel finalized their divorce. On 16 July 1997, he married researcher and former student, Victoria Álvarez Ruiz de Ojeda.

He died on 12 February 2026, at the age of 97.
