= Santiago Muñoz Machado =

Spanish academic (born 1949)

The Most Excellent Santiago Muñoz Machado
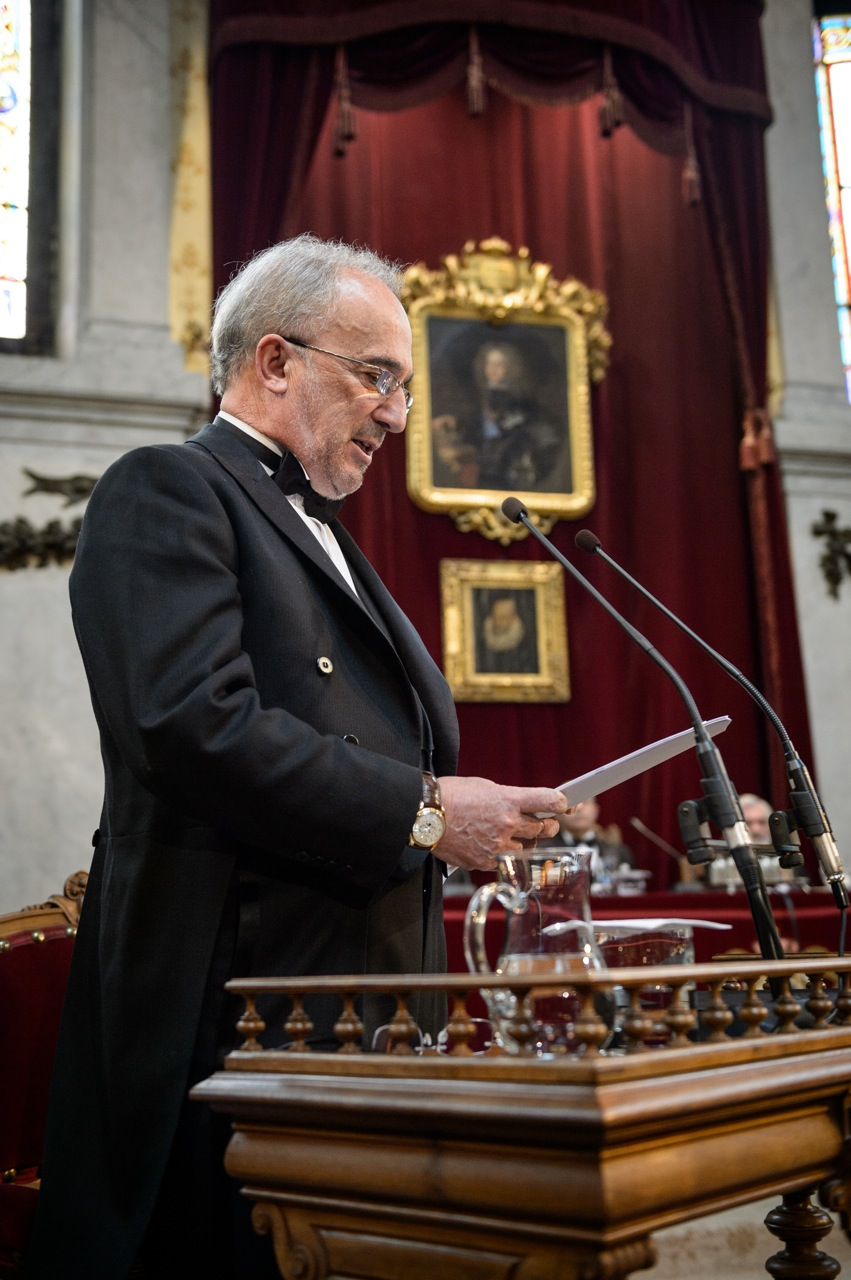
- Muñoz addressing the RAE in 2013
- Born: 10 January 1949 (age 77); Pozoblanco (Córdoba), Spain

Seat r of the Real Academia Española
- Incumbent
- Assumed office 26 May 2013 (Note: Elected on 13 December 2012)
- Preceded by: Mingote

Director of the Real Academia Española
- Incumbent
- Assumed office 10 January 2019 (Note: Elected on 20 December 2018)
- Preceded by: Darío Villanueva

Santiago Muñoz Machado (born 10 January 1949) is a Spanish jurist and academic, director of the Royal Spanish Academy and the Association of Academies of the Spanish Language since 10 January 2019. As a jurist, he specialized in administrative and constitutional rights. He is also a member of the Royal Academy of Moral and Political Sciences and editor of the Diccionario del español jurídico (Dictionary of Spanish Judiciary) and the Diccionario panhispánico del español jurídico (Pan-Hispanic Dictionary of Spanish Judiciary).

== Life and career ==
He has also been the a member of the Superior Body of Civil Administrators of the State since 1973. When the body was named the Civil Administration, he was President of the Government from 1973 to 1980.

He is a professor of the Complutense University of Madrid, where he has professor of Administrative Rights since 1994. He became a professor at the University of Valencia in 1980, and two years later, professor of the same field in the University of Alcalá de Henares.

=== List of works ===
- La sanidad pública en España (evolución histórica y situación actual), Instituto de Estudios Administrativos, Madrid, 1975.
- Expropiación y Jurisdicción, Instituto de Estudios Administrativos, Madrid, 1976.
- Las elecciones locales (en colaboración con L. Cosculluela Montaner), Civitas, Madrid, 1979.
- El ordenamiento jurídico de la Comunidad Europea y la Constitución Española, Ed. Civitas, Madrid, 1980.
- Las potestades legislativas de las Comunidades Autónomas, Civitas, Madrid, 1979, 2ª Edición, 1981.
- Derecho Público de las Comunidades Autónomas, 2 tomos, Civitas 1982 y 1984. (Note: Segunda edición de Iustel, en 2006.)
- La libertad de ejercicio de la profesión y el problema de las atribuciones de los técnicos titulados, en colaboración con L. Parejo Alfonso y E. Ruiloba Santana, Instituto de Estudios de Administración Local, Madrid, 1983.
- Cinco Estudios sobre el poder y la técnica de legislar, Civitas, Madrid, 1986.
- El Estado, el Derecho Interno y la Comunidad Europea, Civitas, Madrid, 1986.
- Tratado de Derecho Comunitario Europeo. Estudio sistemático desde el Derecho Español. Ed. Civitas, 1986, 3 vols. (Dir, junto a E. García de Enterría, y J. González Campos).
- Libertad de prensa y procesos por difamación, Ariel, 1988.
- Tratado de Derecho Municipal, 2 vols, Ed. Civitas, 1988. 2ª ed., Civitas 2003.
- La reserva de jurisdicción, La Ley, 1989.
- La Unión Europea y las mutaciones del Estado, Alianza Universidad, Madrid, 1.993.
- Público y privado en el mercado europeo de la televisión, Civitas, Madrid, 1993.
- La formación y la crisis de los servicios sanitarios públicos, Alianza Editorial, Madrid, 1.995.
- La responsabilidad civil concurrente de las Administraciones Públicas (y otros estudios sobre responsabilidad), Civitas 1992. (Note: 2ª edic. Civitas, Madrid, 1998.)
- Derecho Europeo del Audiovisual (Actas del Congreso dirigido por S. Muñoz Machado, organizado por la Asociación Europea de Derecho del Audiovisual presidida por él, celebrado en Sevilla en octubre de 1996), Escuela Libre Editorial, Madrid, 1997, 2 vols.
- Política social de la Unión Europea en materia de minusvalías (Dir., con R. de Lorenzo García), Escuela Libre Editorial, Madrid, 1997.
- Servicio Público y Mercado (4 volúmenes) Civitas, Madrid, 1998; Volumen I, Los fundamentos; Volumen II, Las telecomunicaciones; Volumen III, La televisión; Volumen IV, El sistema eléctrico.
- Las estructuras del bienestar, 4 volúmenes, director con J.L. García Delgado y L. González Seara), Escuela Libre Editorial, Ed. Cívitas, 1997-2002; (Note: Vol I: Derecho, economía y sociedad en España; Vol II: Las estructuras del bienestar en Europa; Vol III: Propuesta de reforma y nuevos horizontes.)
- Los animales y el Derecho, Civitas, Madrid, 1999.
- La regulación de la red. Poder y Derecho en Internet. Taurus, Madrid, 2000.
- La resurrección de las ruinas (El caso del Teatro Romano de Sagunto), Civitas, Madrid, 2002.
- Los grandes procesos de la Historia de España, Crítica, Barcelona, 2002.
- Tratado de Derecho Administrativo y Derecho Público General
  - I. La formación de las instituciones públicas y su sometimiento al Derecho, 1ª ed. Civitas-Aranzadi, 2004; 2ª ed. Iustel 2006; reimpresión 2009. 1440 págs.
  - II. El ordenamiento jurídico, Iustel, Madrid, 2006. 1408 págs.
  - III. La organización territorial del Estado. Las Administraciones Públicas, Iustel, Madrid, 2009. 1240 págs.
  - IV. La actividad administrativa, Iustel, Madrid, 2011, 1108 págs.
- Constitución, Ed. Iustel, 2004. 352 págs.
- Diccionario de Derecho Administrativo, Iustel, Madrid, 2005. 2 vols., 2.736 páginas
- Comentarios a las Leyes de Fundaciones y mecenazgo (Dir. Junto con M. Cruz Amorós y R. de Lorenzo García), Iustel, Madrid, 2005.
- El problema de la vertebración del Estado en España (Del siglo XVIII al siglo XXI), Iustel, 2006. 384 págs.
- El Estado-Nación en dos encrucijadas históricas (director junto con J.M. de Bernardo Ares), Iustel, Madrid, 2006.
- Comentarios al Estatuto de Autonomía para Andalucía (Dir. junto con M. Rebollo Puig), Civitas, Madrid, 2008.
- Constitución y Leyes Administrativas fundamentales. Autor junto con Tomás Ramón Fernández y Juan Alfonso Santamaría Pastor, Iustel, 2008.
- Comentarios a la Ley de la Lectura del Libro y de las Bibliotecas, Iustel, Madrid, 2008.
- Código de las Leyes Administrativas. Autor junto con Eduardo García de Enterría y Juan Francisco Mestre Delgado, 16ª edición, Civitas Thomson Reuters, 2012.
- El Planeamiento Urbanístico, (junto con el Catedrático de Derecho Administrativo prof. Mariano López Benitez), 2ª ed. Colección Biblioteca de Derecho Municipal, Iustel, 2009.
- Derecho de la Regulación Económica, I. Fundamentos e instituciones de la regulación (S. Muñoz Machado y J. Esteve Pardo, Dirs.), Iustel, Madrid, 2009
- Derecho de la Regulación Económica, III. Sector energético, 2 Tomos (S. Muñoz Machado, M. Serrano González y Mariano Bacigalupo, Dirs.)., Iustel, Madrid, 2009
- Anuario de Derecho de Fundaciones, Iustel, Madrid, 2009.
- Riofrío. La justicia del señor Juez, Edhasa, 2010.
- Tratado de Derecho Municipal, 4 vols., 3ª ed., Iustel, 2011.
- Sepúlveda, cronista del emperador, Edhasa, 2012.
- Informe sobre España. Repensar el Estado o destruirlo, Editorial Critica, 2012, 4ª ed. 2014.
- Derecho de la Regulación Económica, V: Audiovisual, Director, Iustel, 2012.
- Los itinerarios de la libertad de palabra, Editorial_Critica, Barcelona, 2013.
- Crisis y reconstitución de la estructura territorial del Estado, Iustel, serie Conferencias-1, Madrid, 2013.
- Las Comunidades Autónomas y la Unión Europea, Academia Europea de Ciencias y Artes, Madrid, 2013.
- Sobre la pobreza y el Derecho, Iustel, serie Conferencias-2, Madrid, 2014.
- Cataluña y las demás Españas, Editorial_Critica, Madrid, 2014.
- Historia de la Abogacía Española (II volúmenes, 2.000 páginas, Thomson Aranzadi, Madrid 2015).
- Vieja y nueva Constitución, Editorial Critica, Madrid, 2016.
- Diccionario del español jurídico (Dir.), Editorial Espasa, Madrid, 2016.
- Diccionario panhispánico del español jurídico (Dir.), Santillana, Madrid, 2016.

== Awards and recognition ==
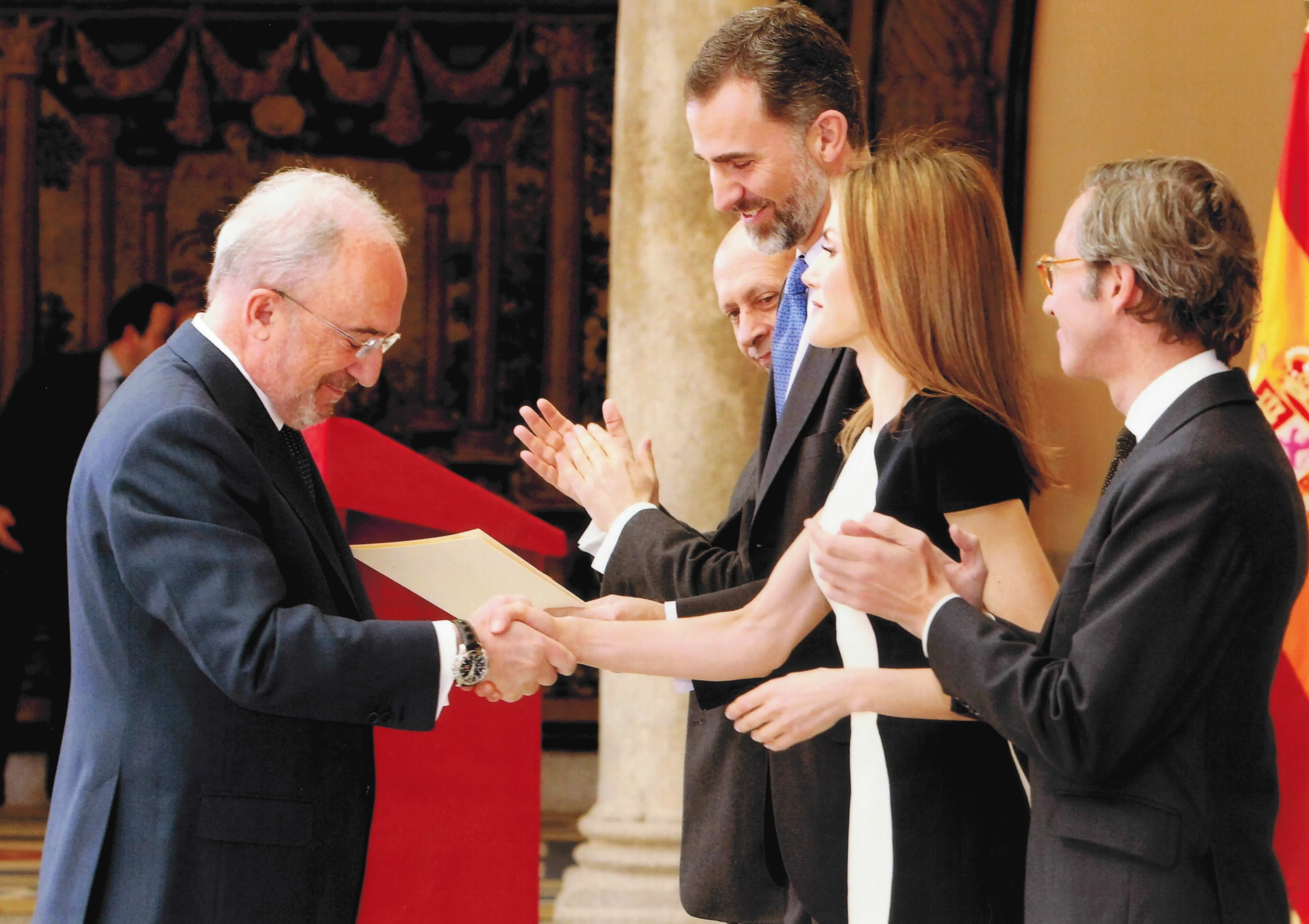
Receiving the National Award for Essays in 2013 from King Felipe VI and Queen Letizia

- National Award of Spanish History 2018
- Member of the Royal Spanish Academy, (seat r).
- Member of the Real Academia de Ciencias Morales y Políticas.
- Academic honors from the Royal Academy of Córdoba
- National Literary Award (Essays) 2013, for his Informe sobre España: repensar el Estado o destruirlo
- Adolfo Posada Award for Derecho público de las comunidades autónomas
- Honorary doctorate, University of Valencia
- Honorary doctorate, University of Córdoba
- Honorary doctorate, University of Extremadura
- Medal of Andalucia (2014)
- Abderramán III Award from the University of Córdoba
- Great Cross of the Orden de San Raimundo de Peñafort.
