= Marquess of Daroca =

Hereditary title of Spanish nobility

Marquessate of Daroca
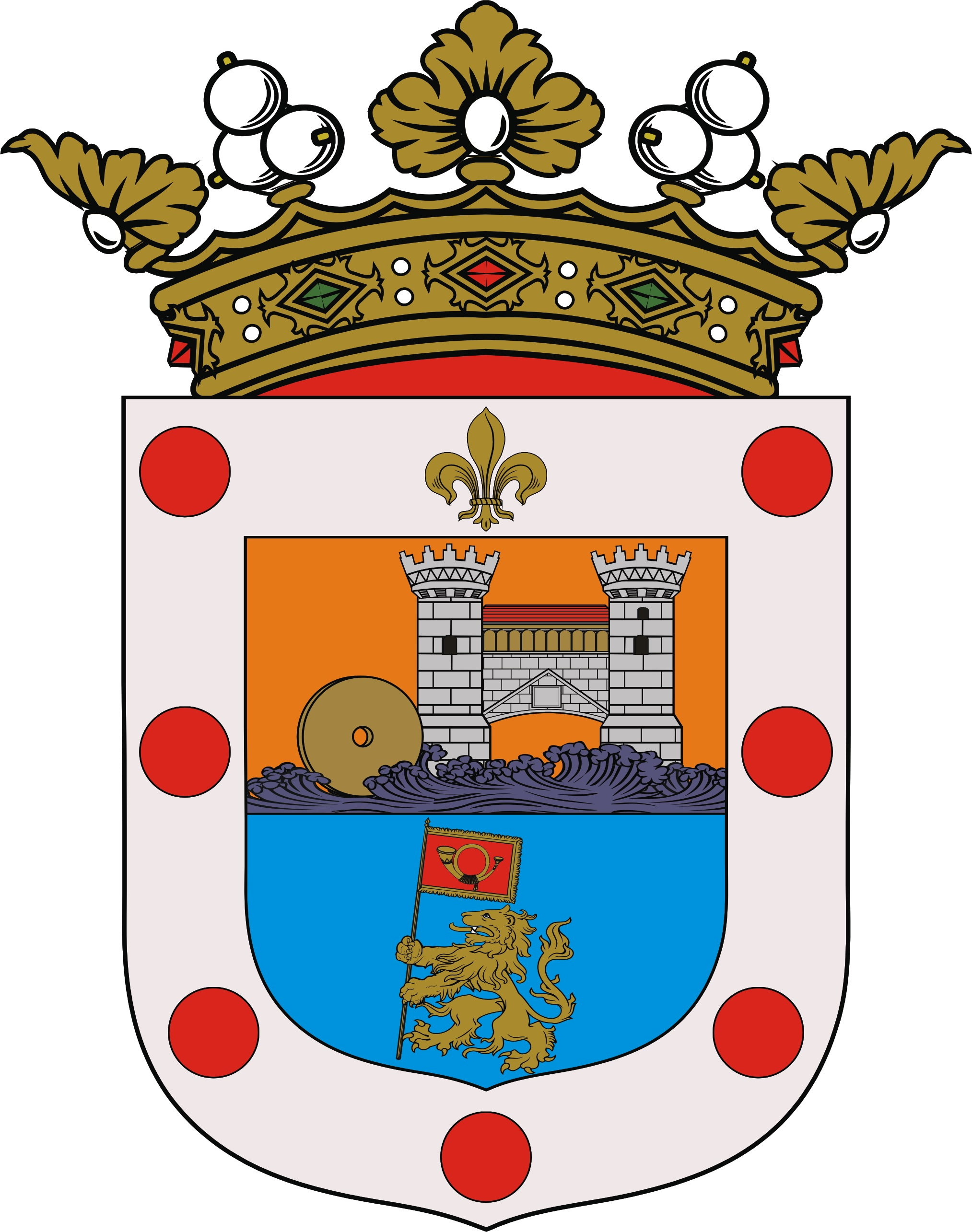
- Creation date: 1 December 2011
- Created by: Juan Carlos I of Spain
- First holder: Antonio Mingote
- Present holder: Pablo Mingote
- Remainder to: Heirs of the body of the grantee
- Status: Extant

Marquess of Daroca (Spanish: Marqués de Daroca) is a hereditary title of Spanish nobility. It was created on 1 December 2011 by King Juan Carlos I of Spain in favor of Antonio Mingote, a cartoonist, writer and journalist. The title recalls the name of his hometown, the town of Daroca.

== Marquesses of Daroca (2011) ==
- Antonio Mingote, 1st Marquess of Daroca (2011–2012)
- Pablo Mingote Fernández, 2nd Marquess of Daroca (2012- ), grandson of the 1st Marquess
