= Darío Villanueva =

Spanish literary critic

The Most Excellent Darío Villanueva
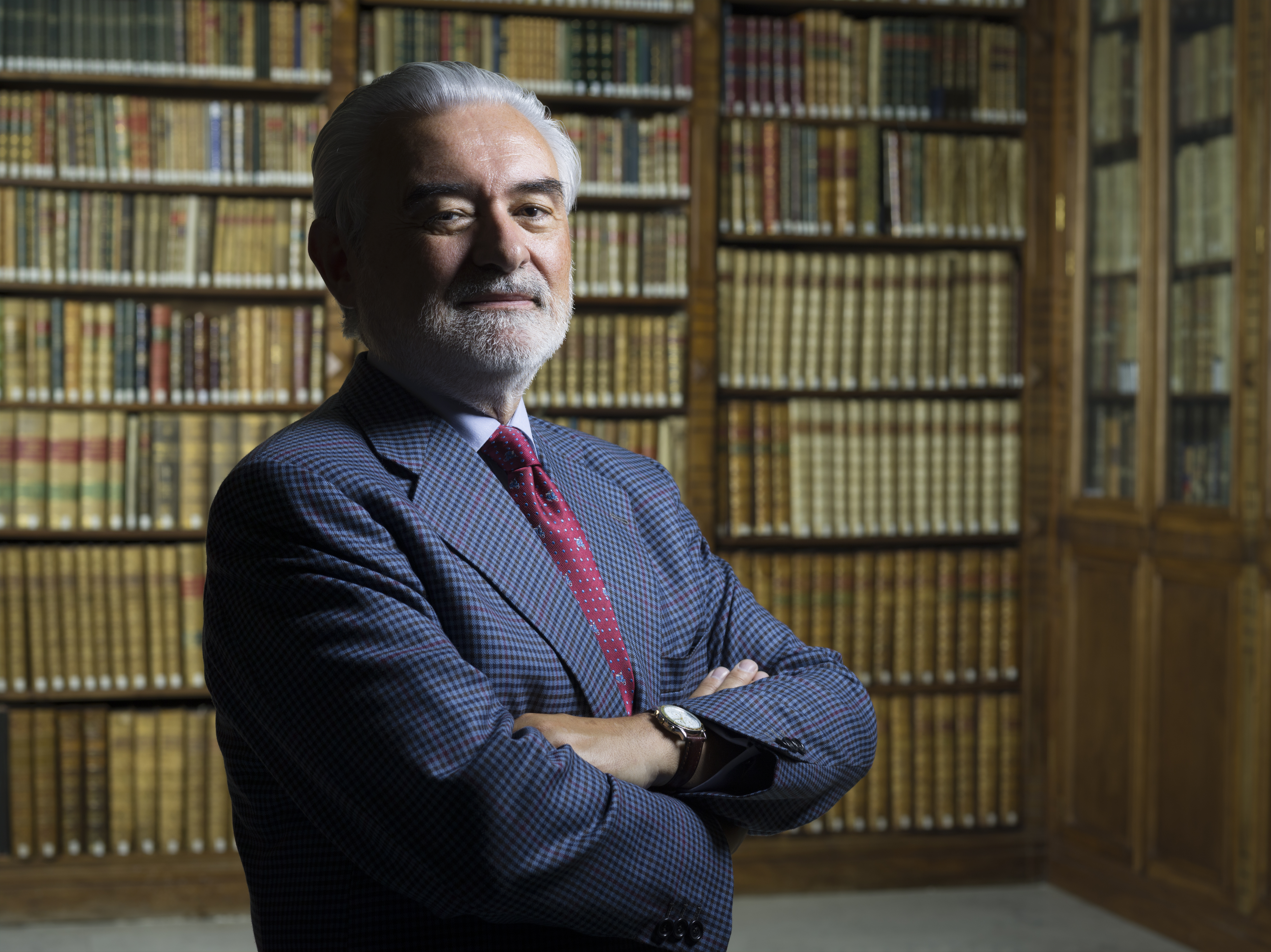
- Villanueva at the 2011 Valladolid International Film Festival
- Born: 5 June 1950 (age 76); Vilalba, Galicia, Spain
- Education: University of Santiago de Compostela (Lic.); Autonomous University of Madrid (PhD)
- Occupations: Literary critic; literary theorist; author; professor; director of the RAE
- Spouse: María Ermitas Penas Varela (before 1978)
- Children: Beatriz (b. 1978); José Francisco (b. 1984)
- Writing career
- Language: Spanish; Galician; English
- Years active: 1973–present

Seat D of the Real Academia Española
- Incumbent
- Assumed office 8 June 2008 (Note: Elected on 5 July 2007)
- Preceded by: Alonso Zamora Vicente

Director of the Real Academia Española
- In office 8 January 2015 – 10 January 2019
- Preceded by: José Manuel Blecua Perdices
- Succeeded by: Santiago Muñoz Machado

Signature
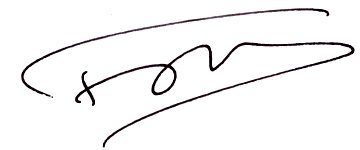

Francisco Darío Villanueva Prieto (born 5 June 1950) is a Spanish literary theorist and critic. He has been a member of the Royal Spanish Academy (Spanish: Real Academia Española) since 2007, and he occupies the chair corresponding to the letter D. Secretary of the Academy from December 2009, he was elected director in 2014, post he held until January 2019.

Villanueva is also a professor of philology at the University of Santiago de Compostela, where he specializes in literary theory and comparative literature.

== Biography ==
The son of an Asturian father and a Galician mother, Villanueva grew up in Luarca, Asturias, where his father served as a judge. He later moved to Lugo, Galicia, where he completed his secondary schooling. In 1970, he relocated to A Coruña.

In 1972, Villanueva obtained a good honours degree in Romance philology from the University of Santiago de Compostela, and in 1976, he received his doctorate cum laude in Hispanic philology from the Autonomous University of Madrid. He was the secretary and later the dean of the Faculty of Philology at the University of Santiago de Compostela from 1978 to 1990. In June 1994, he became rector and in May 1998 he was re-elected for another four-year term. He was also a visiting professor at Middlebury College in 1987, at the University of Colorado in 1988 and 1993, and at the University of Burgundy from 1989 to 1991.

He has received various awards, such as the Gold Medal from the Compostela Group of Universities, the National Order of Merit of Ecuador in 2001, and the Castelao Medal from the Xunta de Galicia in 2005. He is a member of the Xaime Quesada Blanco Foundation, created in 2007 by Jaime Quesada Porto.

Elected to the D seat of the Real Academia Española on 5 July 2007, Villanueva began his post on 8 June 2008. He was secretary of the Real Academia Española from December 2009 on. After José Manuel Blecua stepped down as director, Villanueva was elected on 11 December 2014 (28 votes against 5). He began his directorship on 8 January 2015.

His works have continued to be published for more than forty years. Villanueva is a literary critic, and writes regularly for the magazine El Cultural.

He is married to María Ermitas Penas Varela, who is also a professor of Spanish Literature at the University of Santiago de Compostela. In 1978, their daughter Beatriz was born. She is a licentiate of law and has a master's degree in which she focused on international solidarity in the European Union. Their son José Francisco was born in 1984. He is a student of business management and administration.

== Published work ==
- "El Jarama" de Sánchez Ferlosio. Su estructura y significado, 1973, University of Santiago de Compostela, 167 pages. Corrected and revised second edition, Edition Reichenberger/University of Santiago de Compostela, Kassel/Santiago de Compostela, 1994, 252 pages.
- Estructura y tiempo reducido en la novela, Editorial Bello, Valencia, 1977, 356 pages. Revised second edition, Editorial Anthropos, Barcelona, 1994, 447 pages.
- La novela lírica I. Azorín, Gabriel Miró y La novela lírica II. Pérez de Ayala, Jarnés, Ediciones Taurus, Madrid, 1983, two volumes of 308 and 264 pages, respectively.
- El comentario de textos narrativos: La novela, Ediciones Júcar/Ediciones Aceña, Madrid/Valladolid, 1989, 206 pages. Revised second edition, Ediciones Júcar, Gijón, 1992, 212 pages. Third edition, 1995, 212 pages.
- El polen de ideas. Teoría, Crítica, Historia y Literatura comparada, Promociones y Publicaciones Universitarias, Barcelona, 1991, 406 pages.
- Trayectoria de la novela hispanoamericana actual, Madrid, Espasa-Calpe, 1991, 453 pages. In collaboration with José María Viña Liste. In 1998, the Superior Council of Culture of the Arab Republic of Egypt published the Arab-language version of this work in Cairo, translated by Mohamed Abuelata Abdel Rauof, professor and dean of the Faculty of Al-Alsun at Ain Shams University in the Egyptian capital. This book has 527 pages.
- Teorías del realismo literario, Instituto de España/Espasa-Calpe, Madrid, 1992, 231 pages. English translation by Mihai I. Spariosu and Santiago García-Castañón, Theories of Literary Realism, State University of New York Press, Albany, 1997, 190 pages. Second edition in Spanish, corrected and improved, Biblioteca Nueva, Madrid, 2004, 253 pages.
- La poética de la lectura en Quevedo, University of Manchester, 1995, vi + 46 pages. Second edition, corrected and improved, Siruela, Madrid, 2007, 141 pages.
- Retórica de la lectura y la comunicación periodísticas, La Voz de Galicia, A Coruña, 1995, 51 pages.
- Cronología de la Literatura española, IV. Siglo XX (Primera parte), Ediciones Cátedra, Madrid, 1997, 1236 pages. In collaboration with Margarita Santos Zas.
- Discurso do Rectorado (1994–2002), Consello Social da Universidade de Santiago de Compostela, 2003, 438 pages.
- Valle-Inclán, novelista del modernismo, Tirant lo Blanch, Valencia, 2005, 198 pages.
- Da palabra no tempo. Estudos e ensaios de literatura, Esapiral Maior/Auliga Ensaio, A Coruña, 2007, 319 pages.
- Imágenes de la ciudad. Poesía y cine, de Whitman a Lorca, Literary essays from the professor Miguel Delibes, University of Valladolid, 2008, 286 pages. Corrected second edition, 2009.
- El Quijote antes del cinema. Speech read, 8 June 2008, at a public reception by Hon. Mr. Dr. Darío Villanueva at the opposition of Hon. Mr. Dr. Pere Gimferrer, Real Academia Española, Madrid, 2008, 181 pages.
- Las fábulas mentirosas. Lectura, realidad, ficción, Autonomous University of Aguascalientes, 2008, 211 pages.
- Después de la Galaxia Gutenberg y de la Galaxia McLuhan / After the Gutenberg Galaxy and the McLuhan Galaxy, Bilingual edition with English translation by Robert Dewey, Society of Spanish and Spanish-American Studies, Philadelphia, 2008, 133 pages.
- Mario Vargas Llosa: La novela como literatura / Mario Vargas Llosa: The novel as literature, Bilingual Edition, with English translation by Hope Doyle D'Ambrosio, Society of Spanish and Spanish-American Studies, Temple University, Philadelphia, / Adler Enterprises LLC, Cincinnati, 2011, 210 pages.
- Quance, Roberta Ann. "Imágenes de la ciudad. Poesía y cine, de Whitman a Lorca (review)." The Bulletin of Hispanic Studies 87.5 (2010): 633–635.

== Critical publications, studies and prologues ==
- Edición y estudio de Camilo José Cela, La colmena, Ediciones Noguer, Barcelona, 1983, 400 pages. New edition, considerably extended, Vicens-Vives, Barcelona, 1996, 297 pages. First reprint, 1998; second, 2000 and third 2002. Second edition, corrected and expanded, 2004. First reprint, 2007.
- Edición crítica y estudio de Gustavo Adolfo Bécquer, Desde mi celda, Editorial Castalia, Madrid, 1985, 218 pages. New edition, Editorial Castalia, Madrid, 1993.
- Edición y estudio de Pío Baroja, Las inquietudes de Shanti Andía, Editorial Espasa-Calpe, Madrid, 1988, 18th edition, 346 pages. 32nd edition, Espasa-Calpe, Madrid, 2007.
- Edición y estudio de Ramón del Valle-Inclán, Sonata de invierno, Círculo de lectores, Barcelona, 1990, 148 pages.
- Selección y estudio preliminar de Camilo José Cela. Selected pages, Madrid, Espasa-Calpe, 1991, 288 pages.
- Edición y prólogo de Emilia Pardo Bazán, Obras Completas I (Novelas), Biblioteca Castro, Madrid, 1999, XXXIX + 826 pages. Work done in collaboration with José Manuel González Herrán.
- Edición y prólogo de Emilia Pardo Bazán, Obras Completas II (Novelas), Biblioteca Castro, Madrid, 1999, XXV + 905 pages. With J. M. González Herrán.
- Edición y prólogo de Emilia Pardo Bazán, Obras Completas III (Novelas), Biblioteca Castro, Madrid, 1999, XXVIII + 963 pages. With J. M. González Herrán.
- Edición y prólogo de Emilia Pardo Bazán, Obras Completas IV (Novelas), Biblioteca Castro, Madrid, 1999, XXV + 777 pages. With J. M. González Herrán.
- Edición y prólogo de Emilia Pardo Bazán, Obras Completas V (Novelas), Biblioteca Castro, Madrid, 1999, XXIV + 745 pages. With J. M. González Herrán.
- Edición y prólogo de Emilia Pardo Bazán, Obras Completas VI (Novelas Cortas), Biblioteca Castro, Madrid, 2002. XXVII + 965 pages. With J. M. González Herrán.
- Edición y prólogo de Emilia Pardo Bazán, Obras Completas VII (Cuentos), Biblioteca Castro, Madrid, 2003, XXXIII + 410 pages. With J. M. González Herrán.
- Edición y prólogo de Emilia Pardo Bazán, Obras Completas VIII (Cuentos), Biblioteca Castro, Madrid, 2005, XXIX + 841 pages. With J. M. González Herrán.
- Edición y prólogo de Emilia Pardo Bazán, Obras Completas IX (Cuentos), Biblioteca Castro, Madrid, 2005, XXIX + 751 pages. With J. M. González Herrán.
- Edición y prólogo de Emilia Pardo Bazán, Obras Completas X (Cuentos), Biblioteca Castro, Madrid, 2005, XXXVI + 738 pages. With J. M. González Herrán.
- Selección y prólogo de Rafael Dieste, Obras literarias, Colección Obra Fundamental, Fundación Santander Central Hispano, Madrid, 2006, LV + 423 pages.

== See also ==
- Generation of '98
- Generation of '36
- List of Galician people
- Real Academia Española
- University of Santiago de Compostela
