= María López Sández =

Galician philologist and essayist

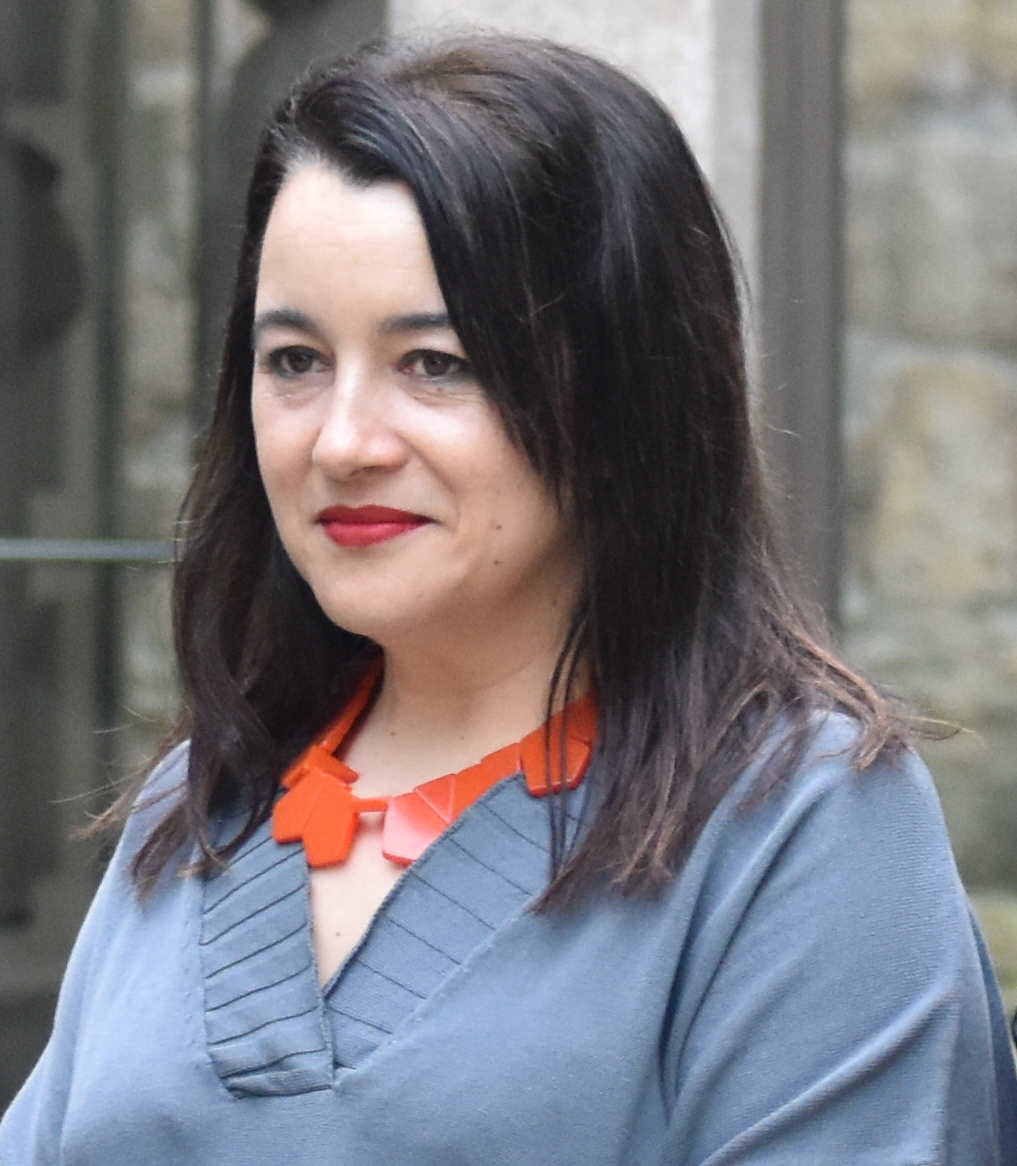
María López Sández (2024)

María López Sández (Lugo, 17 September 1973) is a Galician philologist and essayist. She is an academic numerary of the Royal Galician Academy (RAG).

== Education ==
She graduated from IES Lucus Augusti and obtained a degree in Hispanic, English and Galician-Portuguese Philology from the University of Santiago de Compostela (USD). She received her doctorate in Literary theory and comparative literature from this university with the thesis, A descrición topográfica, o seu papel na construción dun imaxinario cultural no discurso literario galego ("Cantares gallegos", "Arredor de si" e o ciclo textual de "Tagen Ata"). (Topographic description, its role in the construction of a cultural imaginary in the Galician literary discourse - "Cantares Galicians", "Arredor de si" and the textual cycle of "Tagen Ata") (2006). She received the End of Education Career Award of the Autonomous Community of Galicia, and the National Award for Completion of University Studies in Philology.

== Career and research ==
Lopez taught in secondary education at Centro público integrado (CPI) Fonte Díaz, Touro, Spain and at Instituto de Educación Secundaria (IES) Xulián Magariños in Negreira. She is also an associate professor at the USC Faculty of Education Sciences. Her work as a researcher focuses on the relationship between Galician literature and landscape imagery and urban space, as well as the study of cartography as a semiotic of space. She is the author of articles and studies on Rosalía de Castro, Rosalía e a paisaxe galega, Os efectos da aculturación en “El cadiceño” de Rosalía de Castro”. She has participated in international congresses with reports on Castro, O ensaio como subtexto na prosa de Rosalía de Castro, Cantares gallegos, novas perspectivas de análise.[6]

In 2022, she was elected an academic numerary of RAG. On 11 March 2023, she delivered her induction speech Onde abrolla o manancial: a paisaxe na raíz do ensaísmo galego (Where the spring flows: the landscape at the root of the Galician essay).

== Awards and honours ==
- 2023, Premio 8 de Marzo
- 2020, Finalist, Raíña Lupa Award, for A noite da Deusa
- 2014, Finalist, La Voz de Galicia Novel Award, for O faro escuro
- 2012, Repsol Short Narrative Award, for A forma das nubes
- 2007, Ramón Piñeiro Prize for Essay, for Paisaxe e nación. A creación discursiva do territorio.

== Selected works in Galician ==
=== Essays ===
- Paisaxe e nación. A creación discursiva do territorio (2008), Galaxia
- Movendo os marcos do patriarcado, co-author with Marilar Aleixandre, 2021 Translated into Spanish by the authors themselves.

=== Narratives ===
- A forma das nubes (2012)., Galaxia. Second edition, 2014.
- O faro escuro (2015), Galaxia
- A noite da deusa (2020), Galaxia, Costa Oeste ISBN 978-84-9151-469-5

=== Collective works ===
- Libres e vivas (2021), Galaxia
