= Francisco Calvelo =

Spanish filmmaker

F. Calvelo
- Born: Francisco Calvelo Moreira; 1982 (age 43–44); Almería, Andalusia, Spain
- Years active: 2003–present
- Website: http://www.videoclubmisterio.com

Francisco Calvelo Moreira (born 1982) is a Spanish filmmaker born in Almería.

He is a visual author and one of the principal impellers of the experimental and fantastic cinema at present of Galicia. He is a charter member of Videoclub Misterio, Tantoten Animation and of the Marienbad Festival of fantastic short films.

His short film Chrysalis was selected in the Sitges's International Cinema Festival' in 2006, inside the section Brigadoom. In 2007 he concluded Go'El, a short film from a script by José Antonio Ramos that features the popular Galician television actor Santiago Romay. Also in 2007, he collaborated on the full-length film Going nuts, directed by Juanjo Ramírez and produced by Manuel Cristóbal. In 2008 release "Vampire Prison" in the official selection of Sitge's Festival and in 2011 showed his last shortfilm "Carabas" selected in the same category and festival. Also in 2011 founded Tantoten Animation creating animated series like "Coropan", "Parabara" and "Aton & the master key". In 2012 founded Pakarico Games, to develop games for mobile devices like "Breaking Duck", "Triaviatwo" or "Suicide Girl".

== Filmography ==
- Coropan. Animated Series. Director. (2012)
- Parabara. Animated Series. Director. (2011)
- Carabas. Shortfilm. Director. (2011)
- Santiago de Sangre. Shortfilm. Director. (2008)
- Susana & David. Cortometraje. Director, Guionista. (2007)
- Go'El. Short film. Director. (2007)
- Crisálida (Chrysalis). Shortfilm. Director, writer, actor. (2006)
- Con tu cara (With your face). Short film. Director, writer, Actor. (2004)
