= Sueiro Gomes de Soutomaior =

Galician aristocrat (1417 – c. 1490)

Sueiro Gomes
- Lord of Rianxo, Lantañón, Vea and Insua.
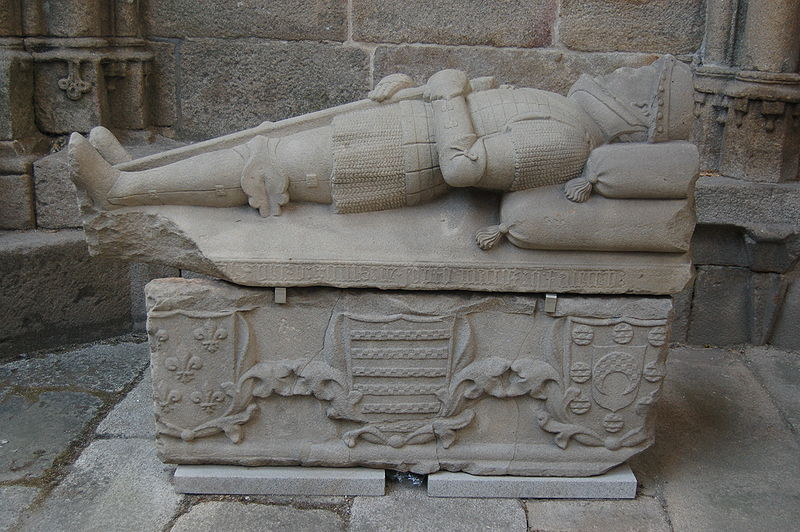
- Sueiro's tomb in Santo Domingos' Convent, Pontevedra (Galicia).
- Predecessor: Paio Gómez de Soutomaior
- Successor: Ines de Mendoza e Soutomaior
- Born: 1417; Rianxo, Galicia.
- Died: c. 1490; Pontevedra, Galicia.
- Burial: Santo Domingos' Convent, Pontevedra, Galicia.
- Spouse: Leonor Vasques de Insua.
- Issue: Ines de Mendoza e Soutomaior
- Dynasty: House of Rianxo
- Father: Paio Gómez de Soutomaior
- Mother: Maior Mendoça

Sueiro Gomes de Soutomaior (1417 – c. 1490) was an important aristocrat in the kingdom of Galicia during the 15th century, heir to a lineage dating back at least to his great-grandmother, the great admiral and Galician earl Pai Gomes Charinho. He lived a hard time with serious tensions between nobles and peasants, was lord of Lantañón, Rianxo, Insua and Vea, bearing the title of marshal.

== Family ==
Son of Paio Gomes de Soutomaior and Maior Mendoça (niece of Archbishop Lope de Mendoça) was born around the year 1417 being half-brother of the famous "Pedro Madruga", he married Leonor Vasques de Insua.

== Irmandiños War ==
Sueiro was one of the nobles who fought the Irmandiños move, it intended to reduce in the kingdom of Galicia the power of nobility against the peasants and little nobles favored economically. Due to this anti-Irmandiños stance, he signed at November 3, 1470, a secret pact against Archbishop Fonseca, the Marquise de Astorga and the Brotherhood, in which he participates with seven other high nobles of the kingdom, Pedro Alvarez Osorio, John de Zúñiga, Sancho de Ulloa, Pedro Alvares de Soutomaior, Lopes Sanches de Moscoso, Diego de Andrade and Diego de Lemos.

As result of this pact, he took sides in the battle of Altamira (held on June 13, 1471) for the coalition of the nobles of the kingdom formed by Gomes Peres of the Navy, Diego de Andrade, Pedro Alvares de Soutomaior and But Pardo de Cela, among other for trying to stop the riots against the great Galician lords. Since the victory against the armies headed by Alonso de Lanzos and the archbishop Fonseca, it's told that Sueiro self-proclaimed "Marshal."

== War of the Castilian Succession ==
During the War of the Castilian Succession when was disputed the legitimacy between Elizabeth and Joanna of Castile, nicknamed by his enemies, "La Beltraneja". Sueiro was politically neutral, but he never was opposed to a possible integration of the kingdom of Galicia in the Portuguese crown, as dowry of Princess Joanna.

== Descendency ==
From marriage Eleanor Vazques de Insua, was born:

- Ines de Mendoça e Soutomaior
