= José María Posada =

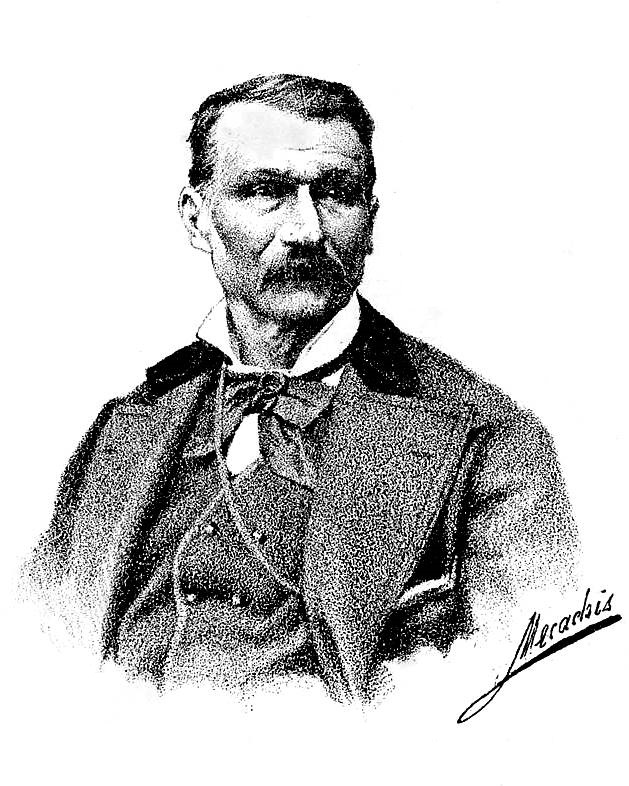
José María Posada Pereira.

José María Posada Pereira (1817, Vigo, Spain – 1886, Pontevedra, Spain ) was a bilingual poet and journalist, who wrote in both Spanish and Galician.

Pereira studied humanities and theology, and finally law at the University of Santiago de Compostela in Spain, graduating in 1845. In 1840 he founded an academy of arts and literature in Santiago, bringing together the best in the region. Posada founded La Aurora de Galicia, a magazine of literature, science, and art, in 1845. He lived in Madrid between 1851 and 1852, studying painting. Moving to Vigo, he established El Faro de Vigo (1852), the oldest newspaper in Spain (still printed today), in which much of his written work appeared. While in Vigo, using the pen name Don Lucas, Posada regularly published humorous writings as well as poetry in the Galician language and legends or leyenda. He wrote a book of memories, Un paseo de Vigo a Bayona [A Stroll from Vigo to Bayonne] (1866). His collected works of poetry are in Poesías Selectas (Selected Poetry) (1888), vol. 16 of the Biblioteca Gallega (Galician Library). Some of these are cheerful, while others are inspirational.

Little by little, Posada yielded to melancholy, and to la saudade, a profound sense of sadness, as in Carta a Ampariño (A Letter to Ampariño). His legends or leyenda, inspired by the traditional romances, are highlighted by Rosalida (which was influenced by the Romance del Conde Olinos, a children's song) and La Bella Infanta (The Beautiful Infant).
