= Benigno Álvares =

Leader and founder of Galician Communist Party

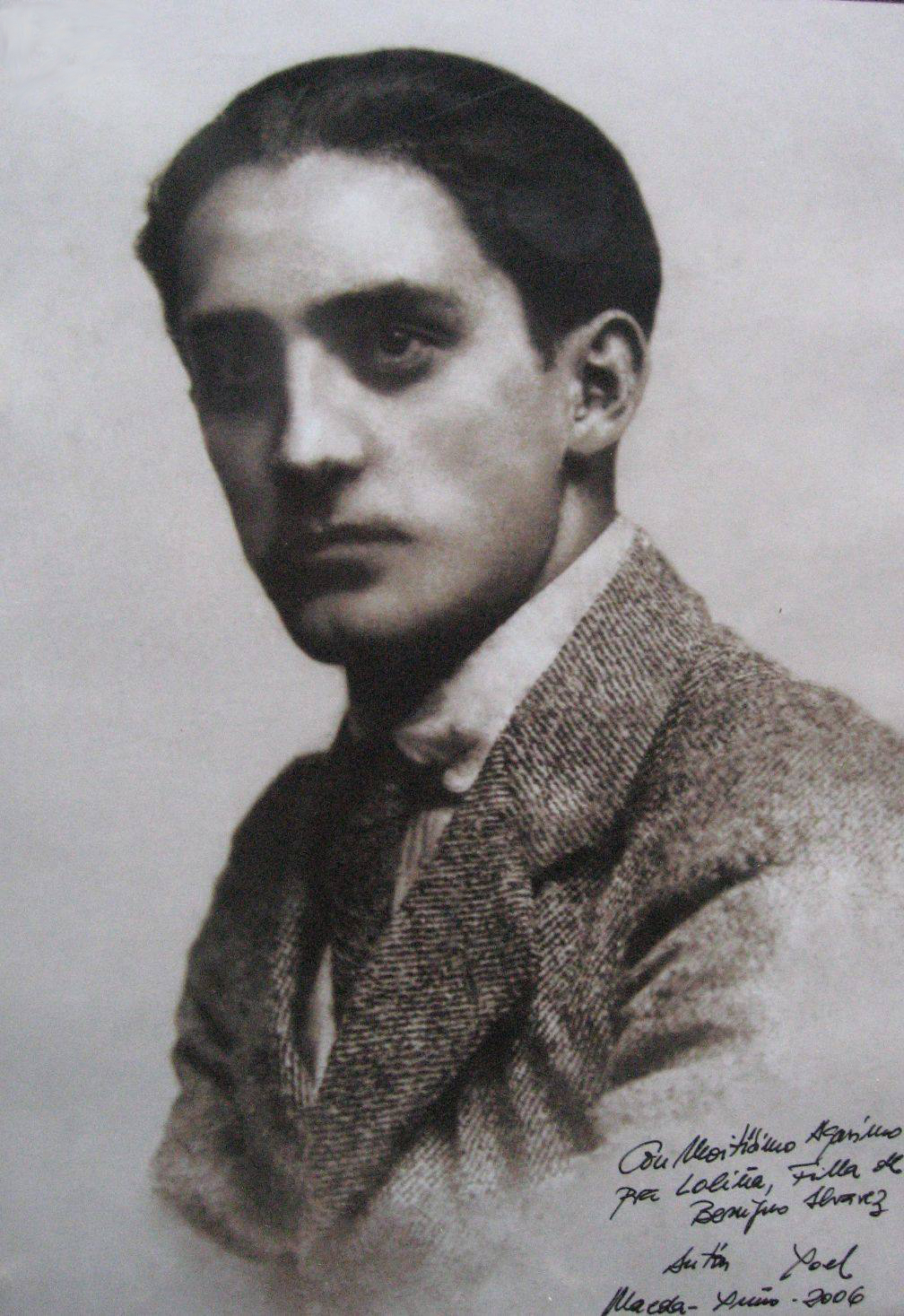
Benigno Álvares

Benigno Álvares (March 11, 1900, in Maceda, Province of Ourense, Spain — 1937, in San Mamede, Galicia). Leader and founder of Galician Communist Party, Galician antifascist activist and partisan against Francisco Franco. This veterinary surgeon became provincial secretary of the Communist Party of Spain (PCE) in Ourense (Galicia) and president of the Provincial Peasant Federation, throughout the Second Spanish Republic. After the military coup in 1936 and the overthrow of Galicia by the franquist domain, he was haunted until his death by the local fascists, in 1937. His corpse was then shown by Civil Guard, tied to a truck, with a sign saying "Here's the Maceda's veterinary surgeon. Communism has died in Ourense".

== Childhood, youth and political activism ==
Son of a veterinary surgeon so-called Demétrio, and of a schoolteacher, Felisa, his family belongs to local bourgeoisie, and his father was mayor of Maceda (Arnóia's region, in Galicia), between 1913 and 1919.

Benigno studied primary education in Maceda until he was eight years, and then he moved to the Galician capital, Santiago de Compostela, where he studied secondary education and then he did a degree in Veterinary Medicine. He finished the degree when he was twenty years old, in 1920. Then, he came to Maceda and worked in his father's veterinary clinic. During his student's years he was involved in student political activity, and he stood out because of his social commitment, especially during the period 1915-1916.

During the twenties, he sympathizes with socialist ideas, and becomes to approach the Radical Socialist Party (PRS). Before that, in 1926, he had participated in the Ourense Veterinary Association. He's appreciated as a good professional and São Mamede's mountain range's people are found of him on account of his professional dedication in a poor region like this.

In those days, he collaborated with the agrarian movement, and wrote in publications such as "La Zarpa". He maintained fraternal relations with agrarian leaders like Basílio Álvares, on issues as rural rules abolition and struggle against rural tyranny in Galician land.

== In the 1930s: Galician commitment in the communist ranks ==
In 1930, Benigno was arrested under the charge of "agit-prop activities" because he had taken part in activities in support of the poorest Galician people in those years. Then, he made a hunger-strike against arbitrary repression he was subjected to. The next year, with the Second Republic coming (April 14), Benigno became Maceda's mayor, with a socialist program. A month later, he activates the Ourense Communist Party County Section, with other well-known activists, like Luís Souto (later, private secretary of Castelao in his American exile, from 1938), Gomes del Valle, Gaioso Frias, Clemente Vidal, Juan Nóvoa, Jesusa Prado, etc.

Benigno moves to Ourense, in order to devote himself to politics, as the Communist Party politic secretary in that county. He defends not only the communist goals, but also the Galician national emancipation, considering it a nation without a state. Therefore, in 1932 he suggests to the party's Galician committee, which head office is in Vigo, the foundation of the Galician Communist Party, when the Communist Party was present in several Galician cities, such as Vigo, Ourense, Ferrol, Pontevedra, and A Coruña, but with no more than 300 activists.

Galician committee defeats the proposal, and disapproves his political line as person in charge of "El Soviet", the party's publication. The Spanish Central Committee dislikes the Galician Benigno's guidance too, but "El Soviet" achieved 23 editions.

In 1932, he and three other Galician comrades take part in fourth Spanish Congress of the Communist Party in Seville. As a Galician delegate, Benigno demands his right to defend his report on agrarian issues in the Galician language. Congress finally agrees, and a Portuguese comrade performs the function of an interpreter.

In this year, Benigno married Henriqueta Fernandes Igrejas. They had a daughter, Icaro, but she died during the war, after the 1936 cup.

In 1933, he stood in the election as candidate of the Popular Antifascist Block candidacy, but the results were unsuccessful. During the so-called "black two-year Period", Benigno is considered an enemy of the oligarchy in Ourense, and he's arrested under the charge of political activism in 1934.

== 1936: Fascist coup d'etat and resistance. Communists and Galician nationalists hunting ==
The left-wing Popular Front wins the Spanish 1936 elections, and Benigno Álvares is one of the candidates in Galicia, with Alexandre Bóveda as the Galician number one candidate. An electoral fraud prevented him from being chosen member of parliament. So the right-wing candidate, José Calvo Sotelo, won the election.

In that same year, Benigno participates in the campaign for a Galician Autonomy Statute, with a tougher stance than his own party.

After the military coup on July 18, some militaries and fascists gangs usurped the power in Galicia and kill thousands of people, including left-wing persons and Galician nationalists. Benigno Álvares and his wife managed to escape to the São Mamede mountain range and to the Edreira area, pursued by the fascists gangs.

Benigno stays hidden until January 1937, in the Monte Rosso Castle, with the help of the Ulhoa family lady, admirer of him. Then, he decides to come back to the mountain and to organize a guerrilla resistance against fascism, around Monte de Ramo and Maceda area. Members of the local oligarchy offer a reward for Benigno Álvares: "1.000 pesetas for anyone who catch him dead or alive".

Through some Portuguese contacts, he receives the offer to escape to America with Leandro Carro, a communist and member of the republican parliament, but Benigno decides to stay and to continue the fight in the Galician inland. The winter of 1937 was very hard for Benigno Álvares in the mountain range. Probably ill of tuberculosis, he is aware of the five peasant's execution that refused to revel to Civil Guard the place where he was hidden. He died next the Penedo's refuge, 100 meters from the Vixueses small village, on March 11, when he was 37 years old, on the way to Maceda. Lisardo Leal took him over a mule, to the local doctor, but was impossible to save him.

His corpse was founded on March 13 and a falangist shot him in the head, and so to receive the reward, but he didn't get it. A sergeant of Civil Guard, instigated by the local falangists, ordered to boast about the fact, with Benigno's corpse tied to a truck on Ourense's streets, and a sign saying "Here's the Maceda's veterinary surgeon. Communism has died in Ourense". The rest of the family will die victim of fascist repression around Ourense and Arnóia area.

== Benigno Álvares memory in Maceda today ==
It took so many years for Benigno's native village to pay tribute to him. It happened in the 90s, when a square was named with the name of 'Benigno Álvares', the antifascist a revolutionary Galician fighter.

== See also ==
- Galicia in the 20th century
- Galician people
- Galician language

== Bibliography ==
- PROL, Santiago: Benigno Álvarez. Un comunista na Galiza dos anos 30. A Nosa Terra, Santo Tirso, Galicia, 2008.
- PROL, Santiago: Benigno Álvarez. Internacionalista ou protonacionalista?. Abrente nº 26, Compostela, Galicia, 2002.
- VELASCO SOUTO, Carlos: Represión e alzamento militar en Galiza'. A Nosa Terra, Vigo, Galicia, 2006.
- VELASCO SOUTO, Carlos: Galiza na II República'. A Nosa Terra, Vigo, Galicia, 2000.
