= Mariano Grueiro =

Spanish Galego cultural activist

Mariano Grueiro (born 1975) is a Galego (Galician language) cultural activist, writer, photographer, filmmaker, artist.

He was born in 1975 in Narón, Galicia/Galiza, Spain, and grew up in the naval dockyard town of Ferrol in the 1980s, during a period of major crisis in the Galician shipbuilding industry.

As a photographer his main areas of work are landscapes and documentary. His earliest photographic work was "People in Compostela", a photographic essay about the Galician capital Santiago de Compostela (1996–1999). This was followed by a series on the Galician coast (1999) and subsequently on the December 2002 political demonstrations in Santiago de Caompostela. His SO2 project linked the Berlin Alexanderplatz communications tower and a depopulated village in rural Galicia.

He has been writing about Galician society since 1994 and in 2001, published a collection of essays under the title Wildliza.

His work as a filmmaker has been closely linked to his activities as a political campaigner on the environmental and political issues raised by the 2002 Prestige oil spill, a marine environmental disaster on a scale exceeding the Exxon Valdez incident. His most well-known film is Awaking of the Nightmare[sic] (1-12-2002. A manifestación: O espertar do sono), about the great Galician nationalist and environmentalist protest rally on 1 December 2002.

He campaigns for economic development and grassroots artistic activity in rural Galicia and in particular provision of comprehensive rural broadband access as an instrument of social cohesion. He publishes a gueblo (blog) in which he is strongly critical of the poverty and political and economic inequalities of rural Galicia and the harsh impact of economic migration. He is particularly critical of the persistence of caciquismo – the control exercised by powerful local figures over the political process in rural areas. He stood in the 2008 elections as candidate for the Partido Obreiro Socialista Internacionalista (POSI) to represent the province of Lugo – a province described as ridden with caciquismo – in the Spanish Senate. He is also a pioneer of podcasting in the Galego language.

== See also ==
- El Ferrol Diario
