= Miguel Ángel Villar Pinto =

Spanish writer (born 1977)

Miguel Angel Villar Pinto
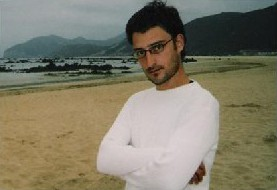
- Born: 29 December 1977 (age 48); A Coruña, Spain
- Occupation: Writer
- Writing career
- Genres: fairy tale, Children's literature, Novel

Miguel Ángel Villar Pinto (A Coruña, 29 December 1977) is a Spanish writer, author of fairy tales, children's books, and novels.

== Biography ==
Villar Pinto participated in several archaeological excavations in (Huesca), (Basque Country) and (Galicia), in addition to archival works while he was studying history. In 2005 he published his first book.

== Bibliography ==
=== Novels ===
- La sangre de Dios. Septem Ediciones, 2005. ISBN 978-84-95687-63-0.
- Balarian. Castellar de la Frontera: Castellarte, 2006. ISBN 978-84-933354-9-6.
- El camino del guerrero. Málaga: Corona Borealis, 2006. ISBN 978-84-95645-80-7.

=== Fairy tales ===
- Leyendas de Arabia. Málaga: Corona Borealis, 2006. ISBN 978-84-95645-74-6.
  - Abdellah y el genio de la botella
  - El más digno sucesor
  - El mensaje de las olas
  - El sello de Menandro
  - Ériador
  - La cueva en el desierto
  - La muerte de los dioses
  - La última batalla
- Los bosques perdidos. Edimáter: 2007. ISBN 978-84-935175-1-9.
  - Búho Grande
  - Dindán
  - Elisa y los animales del bosque
  - El pequeño Tinsú
  - El problema de Gengar
  - El rey leñador
  - Iberto y la mala suerte
  - La estatua y su pedestal
  - La pregunta del emperador
  - La princesa infeliz
  - Tonelcillo
- El bazar de los sueños. Edimáter: 2009. ISBN 978-84-96870-21-5.
  - Broan y Turin
  - El bazar de los sueños
  - El bosque de los ciervos blancos
  - El carpintero sin suerte
  - El cofre de los náufragos
  - El estanque mágico de Verdesmeralda
  - El viaje de Breogán
  - El vuelo de los cisnes
  - La biblioteca de Alejandría
  - La deuda del marajá
  - La maldición de la sirena de oro
  - Las estrellas capturadas

=== Children's books ===
- Narsú y el collar mágico. Edimáter, 2008. ISBN 978-84-935175-8-8.
- Las preguntas de Nair. Edimáter, 2009. ISBN 978-84-96870-17-8.
- Este circo es un desastre. Edimáter, 2010. ISBN 978-84-96870-43-7.
- La maldición del castillo desencantado. Edimáter, 2011. ISBN 978-84-96870-74-1.
