= Martin Veiga =

Martín Veiga Alonso (Noia, Province of A Coruña, 1970) is a Galician academic, poet, translator and critic.

== Biography ==
Martín Veiga is a licenciado in Galician-Portuguese philology by the University of Santiago de Compostela. He completed his PhD in Hispanic Studies at University College Cork (Ireland), with a thesis studying the work of Galician poet Antón Avilés de Taramancos.

He taught Galician language and culture from 1999 to 2005 at the Irish Centre for Galician Studies (UCC), where he was also appointed as vice-director of that centre (2000-2008). At present, he lectures in Hispanic Culture, Spanish language and literature at the Department of Hispanic Studies (UCC). He was appointed as director of the Centre for Creative Writing (UCC) in 2007 and director of the Irish Centre for Galician Studies in 2008.

Veiga has been responsible for the organization of academic seminars and conferences and he has taken part in a number or literary readings. He is a regular contributor to press, literature journals and books with essays, articles, poems and translations. He has also been awarded with numerous literary and translation accolades, such as Domingo Antonio de Andrade, Rosalía de Castro, Xacobeo de Poesía (1999), Premio Espiral Maior de Poesía, Ramón Cabanillas, Premio de poesía Fiz Vergara Vilariño, and the equivalent to a Galician national prize of literature, the Premio Esquío de Poesía (2005).

== Works ==
=== Poetry ===
- Tempo van de porcelana, 1990.
- As últimas ruínas, 1994.
- Ollos de ámbar, 2005.
- Fundaxes, 2006.

=== Essay ===
- Raiceiras e vento. A obra poética de Antón Avilés de Taramancos, 2003.
- Antón Avilés de Taramancos, 2003.

=== Critic ===
As a critic he has been involved in the annotated edition of Cantos Caucanos by Antón Avilés de Taramancos, and in the edition and publication of Raiceiras e vento. A obra poética de Antón Avilés de Taramancos. He also wrote the biography of Antón Avilés de Taramancos.

=== Research ===
- A obra literaria de Anton Aviles de Taramancos: un estudo critico, 2007 (PhD Thesis)
