= Ana Isabel Boullón Agrelo =

Spanish linguist

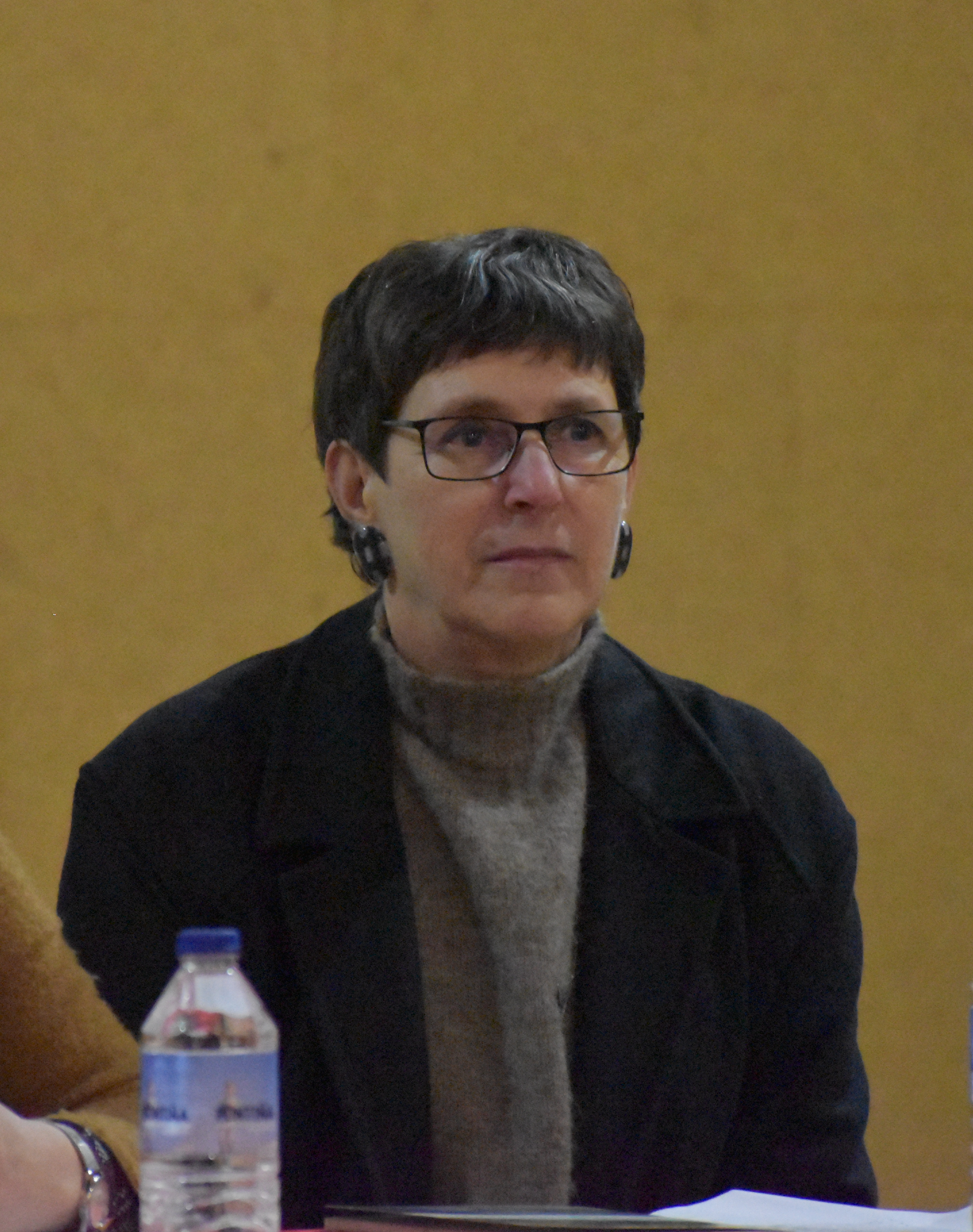
- Ana Boullón (2024)
- Born: 1 April 1962 (age 63); A Pobra do Caramiñal, Spain
- Occupation: Linguist
- Known for: Academic numerary, Royal Galician Academy

Ana Isabel Boullón Agrelo (commonly known as Ana Boullón; A Pobra do Caramiñal, 1 April 1962) is a Galician linguist. Since 2012, she has been a corresponding member of the Royal Galician Academy (RAG) and in the session of 22 December 2020, she was elected an academic numerary. She read her induction speech at A Pobra do Caramiñal on 11 November 2021, answered by Ramón Lorenzo.

== Education ==
After graduating in Galician-Portuguese Philology from the University of Santiago de Compostela, Boullon obtained her doctorate with the thesis Contribución ó estudio da antroponimia medieval galega (séculos VIII-XIII) (Contribution to the study of medieval Galician anthroponymy, 8th-13th centuries) (1999), directed by Ramón Lorenzo.

== Career and research ==
In the 1980s, she taught Galician courses for non-university teachers, Corporación Radio e Televisión de Galicia (CRTVG) journalists, and civil servants. She was a teacher at the Educación Xeral Básica (EXB) University Teacher Training School in A Coruña (1988) and the University of Vigo Pontevedra Campus (1990–1991). Since 1991, she has been a professor at University of Santiago de Compostela Faculty of Philology.

With Henrique Monteagudo, she edited the medieval texts, De verbo a verbo. Documentos en galego anteriores a 1260 (2009). She studied the textual transmission of the Crónica de Santa María de Iria and participated in the commission that prepared the rules for editing the medieval documentation contained in the "Gallaeciae Monumenta Historica".

Boullon works on topics related to language and toponymy. As a member of RAG's Onomastics Seminary, she has actively participated in the revision of the Nomenclátor de Galicia (Galician nomenclature) and is the main researcher for the toponymy of Galicia and Portugal in the Toponomasticon Hispaniae project. In the field of lexicography, she was part of the divulgative works team. Since the beginning of the 1990s, she has dedicated herself to researching Galician names and surnames. Since 1990, she has been a member of the international research project Dicionario histórico dos apelidos romanicos (PATROM). Together with Xulio Sousa, she planned the Cartografía dos apelidos de Galicia (Cartography of Galician Surnames), RAG-ILG (Galician Language Institute). She has collaborated in the preparation of the Classification of the 10 most popular names in Galicia (2000–2015). She coordinates the preparation of a large dictionary of Galician surnames, and also the Guía dos nomes galegos (Guide to Galician names).

She is a contributor to the magazines Verba and Cadernos da Lingua. Since 2007, she has been part of the Dictionnaire Étymolgique Roman project, which aims to produce a new pan-Romance etymological dictionary successor to Wilhelm Meyer-Lübke's Romanisches Etymologisches Wörterbuch (Etymological Dictionary of Romance) (1911). She is a consultant for Galician names in Brazil's Projeto Novo Dicionário de Nomes em Uso (new dictionary of names in use project).

In the field of literary translation, she participated in the translation of the collection of mythology series published by Xerais (Roman, Viking, Egyptian, Celtic), as well as other novels published by Xerais and Alfaguara. She is a member of the Association of Galician Translators and the editorial board of its magazine, Viceversa, which is published in collaboration with the University of Vigo.

== Selected works ==
- Boullón Agrelo, Ana Isabel (2012). "Trazos da Oralidade na Lingua Galega Medieval (Traits of Orality in the Medieval Galician Language)". In Juan Pedro Sánchez Méndez (ed.). Oralidad y Escritura en la Edad Media Hispánica [Orality and Writing in the Hispanic Middle Ages]. Valencia: Tirant Humanidades. ISBN 9788415442424.
- Boullón Agrelo, Ana Isabel, ed. (2007). Na nosa lyngoage galega: a emerxencia do galego como lingua escrita na Idade Media [In our Galician lyngoage: the emergence of Galician as a written language in the Middle Ages] (PDF) (in Galician). Santiago de Compostela: Consello da Cultura Galega. pp. 447–473. ISBN 978-84-96530-44-7.
- Boullón Agrelo, Ana Isabel (2002). Actas do 20th Congreso Internacional de Ciencias Onomásticas [Proceedings of the 20th International Congress of Onomastic Sciences] (in Spanish). Vol. 2. Fundación Pedro Barrié de la Maza. pp. 1693–96. ISBN 978-84-9752-014-0.
- Boullón Agrelo, Ana Isabel (1999). Antroponomia medieval galega (ss. VIII - XII) [Medieval Galician anthroponomy (8th - 12th centuries)]. Tübingen: Niemeyer. ISBN 978-3-484-55512-9.
