= Jacinto Rey =

Spanish novelist

- Born: February 23, 1972 (age 54); Vigo, Galicia, Spain
- Occupation: Novelist
- Writing career
- Genres: Thriller, historical fiction
- Website: www.jacintorey.com

Jacinto Rey (born February 23, 1972, in Vigo) is a Spanish novelist. After completing his studies in economics in Spain and the UK, he worked for several multinational companies in Germany and Switzerland. A polyglot and widely travelled, he currently lives in France.

His first novel, El cirujano de Las Indias (The Surgeon of the Indies), was published in 2007 and highlights the contradictions of the Spanish colonization in America. In 2009, he made his first foray into crime fiction with El último cliente (The Last Customer), which opens the series featuring Amsterdam police inspector Cristina Molen. His second book in this series, El hombre de El Cairo (The Man from Cairo) was released in 2011. Jacinto Rey is also the author of a book of poems, El pájaro alunado (The moonlit bird), and two books of short stories.

== Works ==
=== Novels ===
- El cirujano de Las Indias (The Surgeon of the Indies). Historical fiction. Ediciones El Andén, June 2007. ISBN 978-84-935758-3-0.
- El último cliente (The Last Customer). Crime fiction. Editorial Viceversa, May 2009. ISBN 978-84-937109-1-0.
- El hombre de El Cairo. (The Man from Cairo). Crime fiction. Editorial Viceversa, January 2011. ISBN 978-84-92819-47-8.

=== Short stories ===
- El pintor de La Habana y otros relatos.

=== Poetry ===
- El pájaro alunado (The moonlit bird).
