= Beremundo González Rodríguez =

Beremundo González Rodríguez (Petín, 1909-Paris, 1986) was a Galician writer and communist politician.

He spent some time in Cuba in the 1930s and when he came back to Spain, he became a member of the Communist Party of Spain. After the Spanish Civil War, he moved to France and collaborated with Fidel Castro's Cuban Revolution and spent some years in Argentina before coming back to France.

== Works ==
- Poética Galicia. Paris, 1971 (1973, 2ª ed.).
- La poesía revolucionaria española. Paris, 1976.
- Háblame de Amor, 1969.
- Águila intercontinental, 1970.
- Cité de la Nuit, 1970
- Poèmes pour le Vietnam, 1972 (with Franco Bianciardi).
