= Xesús Ferro Ruibal =

Galician theologian and Latinist (born 1944)

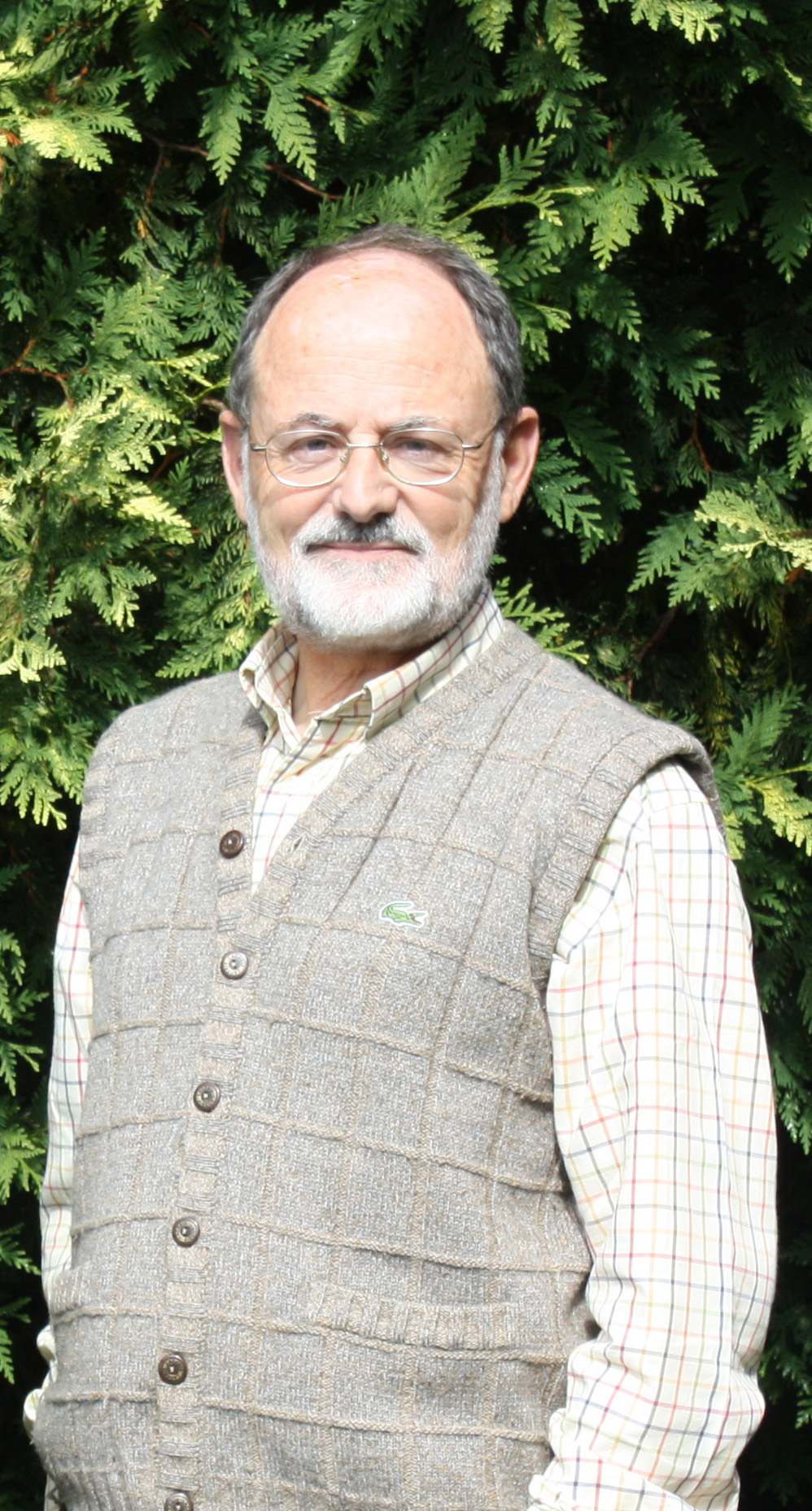
- Born: 1944 (age 81–82); Moraña, Galicia, Spain

Xesús Ferro Ruibal (born 1944 in Moraña) is a theologian, Latinist and writer from Galicia.

He is a member of the Real Academia Galega and he helped translate the Bible to Galician. He works nowadays in a phraseology project of Centro Ramón Piñeiro para a Investigación en Humanidades, where he publishes his logs often.

== Works ==
- Dido e Eneas. Xénese, nacemento e vida de dous personaxes polémicos da Eneida, 1983
- Refraneiro galego básico, 1987
- A Igrexa e a lingua galega, 1988
- Diccionario dos nomes galegos, 1992
- Xosé Chao Rego: renacer galego. (Actas do Simposio-Homenaxe), Fundación Bautista Álvarez de Estudos Nacionalistas, 2010.
- O libro da vaca. Monografía etnolingüística do gando vacún, Centro Ramón Piñeiro para a Investigación en Humanidades, 2010, ISBN 978-84-453-4948-9 (with Pedro Benavente Jareño)
