= Marilar Aleixandre =

Spanish writer, translator and biologist (born 1947)

María Pilar Jiménez Aleixandre
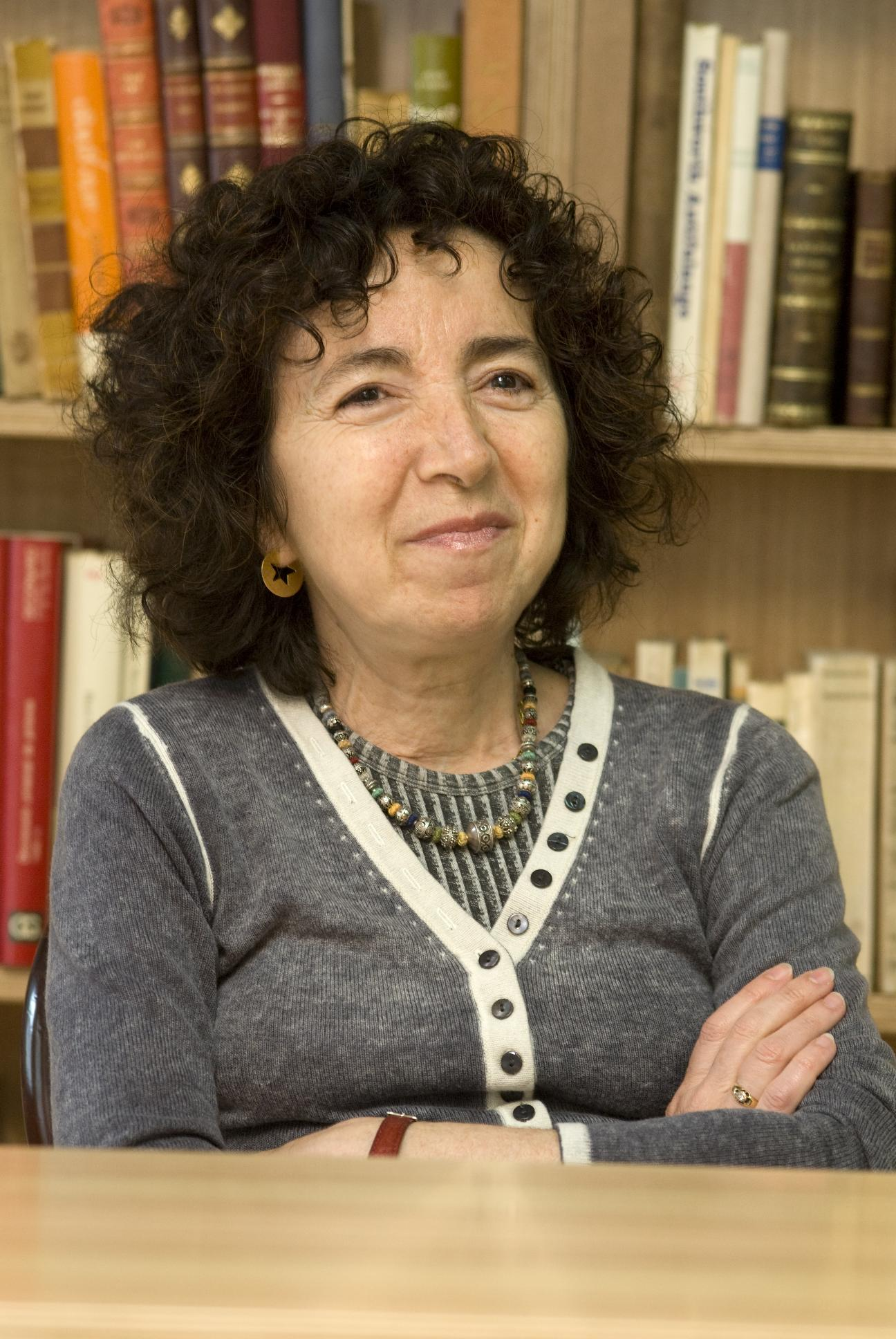
- Aleixandre in 2010
- Born: 1947 (age 78–79) Madrid, Spain
- Occupation: Novelist, poet
- Language: Galician, Spanish

María Pilar Jiménez Aleixandre (born 1947) is a Spanish writer, translator and biologist. She lives in Amaía, Galicia.

== Life and career ==
She was born on born in 1947 in Madrid. The grandparents of Marilar Aleixandre were from Andalusia, Valencia and Madrid. She was born in Madrid in 1947 and has lived in Ceuta and Doña Mencía (Córdoba). She has resided in Galicia since 1973 and has adopted the Galician language as her literary language. She is now one of the most famous Galician language writers. In her own words:

I remember some things of every city where I lived: Ceuta (the lemon tree that we had in our courtyard); Doña Mencía (eating figs at the crack of dawn with my father); Madrid (the cinema club of Areneros, where I saw "Freaks" for the first time); Vigo (the mimosas in blossom); Santiago de Compostela...and other cities where I never lived or where I only lived for a short time: Donostia, Perugia, Boston. And I have a special relationship with Toba, Cée and with a Costa da Morte.

She is a lecturer of biology at the University of Santiago de Compostela, where she has been teaching Environmental and Science Education since 1988. Her first story was Un Conto Sobre Vampiros, followed by Agardando polos morcegos. She then published her first children's book A formiga coxa, and A expedición do Pacífico (Premio da Crítica Galega 1995). She was finalist of the Premio Xerais de Novela in 1992, with Tránsito dos Gramáticos. In 1996 she published the book of stories Lobos nas illas about the difficulty of family relationships, in 1988 the novel A Compañía Clandestina de Contrapublicidade (Premio Álvaro Cunqueiro 1988), and in 2001 Teoría do Caos (Premio Xerais 2001). The majority of her works are translated to Spanish, Portuguese, Catalan and Basque. She has translated the collection of poems Muller ceiba (1996) by Sandra Cisneros from English to Galician, as well as A Caza do Carbairán (1997) by Lewis Carroll and Harry Potter and the Philosopher's Stone (2001) by J.K. Rowling. She has also written the screenplay of 14 episodes of Os escachapedras.

She has taken part in several collective publications of poetry and in the activities of the Batallón Literario da Costa da Morte. In 1998 she won the Award Esquío with the collection of poems Catálogo de velenos. Besides this, she has contributed to the culture and literature magazines Nó, Luzes de Galicia, CLIJ, Festa da Palabra Silenciada, Dorna and El Signo del Gorrión. She also publishes academic works on teaching science.

Aleixandre has been quoted as saying that: Writing allows us to invite people into the worlds that we have imagined.

== Works ==
=== Literary ===
- A formiga coxa, Edicións Xerais, 1989 (Fran Jaraba Illustration)
- O rescate do peneireiro, Edicións Xerais, 1990 (Fran Jaraba Illustration)
- Tránsito dos gramáticos, Edicións Xerais, 1993
- A expedición do Pacífico, Edicións Xerais,1994
- Nogard, 1994
- O trasno de Alqueidón, Edicións Xerais, 1996 (Miguelanxo Prado Illustration)
- Lobos nas illas, Edicións Xerais, 1996
- A compañía clandestina de contrapublicidade, Galaxia, 1998
- Catálogo de velenos, Esquío, 1999
- A banda sen futuro, Edicións Xerais, 1999
- Lapadoiras, Sacaúntos e Cocón, 1999
- Teoría do caos, Edicións Xerais, 2001
- O Rato de Biblioteca e a Gaiteira de Marín, included in Contos para levar no peto, Edicións Xerais, 2001
- Unha presa de terra, Ir Indo Edicións, 2001 (Miguelanxo Prado Illustrations)
- Paxaros de papel, Edicións Xerais, 2001
- El-Rei Artur e an abominable dama, Ir Indo Edicións, 2001
- Basilisa, a princesa sapiño, 2002
- O monstro da chuvia, SM, 2003 (Pablo Amargo Illustrations)
- Desmentindo a primavera, Edicións Xerais, 2003
- Rúa Carbón, Xerais, 2005
- A vaca de Fisterra e a trabe de alcatrán, Tambre, 2005
- Mudanzas, 2007
- A Cabeza da Medusa, Edicións Xerais, 2008.

=== Academic ===
- Traballando coas ciencias da Terra, University of Santiago, 1995 (as co-editor)
- Dubidar para aprender, Edicións Xerais, 1996
- Enseñar Ciencias, Graó, 2003 (as coordinator)

== Awards ==
- Premio Merlín of Children's Books 1994 with A Expedición do Pacífico.
- Premio da Crítica to the literary creation in Galician Language, 1995.
- Premio Rañolas for the best Young/Children's book in Galician Language 1996 with O Trasno de Alqueidón
- Premio Manuel Murguía of Short Story 1997 with Desaforados Muños.
- Premio Álvaro Cunqueiro of Narrative 1997 with A Compañía clandestina de contrapublicidade.
- Honour List IBBY 1997 with A caza do Carbairán (tradition of The Hunting of the Snark) of Lewis Carroll.
- Premio Esquío of Poetry in Galician Language 1998 with Catálogo de velenos.
- Premio Lazarillo 2001 with A Banda Sen Futuro
- Lecturas Galix 2001 with A Banda Sen Futuro
- Premio La Voz de Galicia 2001 with Unha Presa de Terra
- Premio de Poesía Caixanova in 2006 with Mudanzas.
- Premio Fundación Caixa Galicia of young literature in 2008 with A cabeza da medusa.
- National Literature Prize for Narrative 2022 for As malas mulleres
