= Bagpipes =

Woodwind instrument

Bagpipe
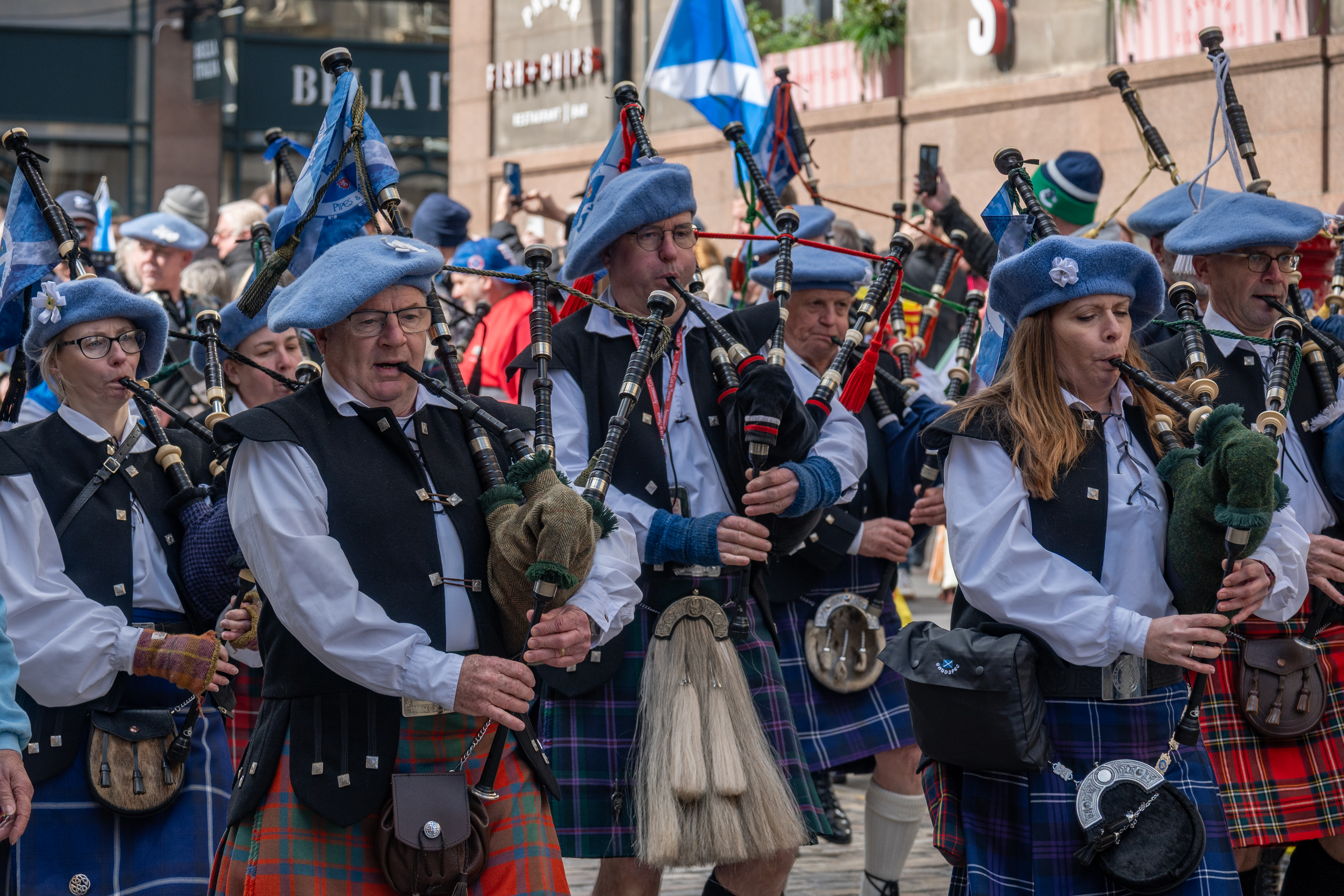
- Bagpipers from Scotland

Woodwind instrument
- Classification: Aerophone; Wind; Woodwind
- Hornbostel–Sachs classification: 422.112 (Reed aerophone with conical bore)

Related instruments
- Oboe; Shawm; Bassoon

Musicians
- List of bagpipers

The bagpipe is a woodwind instrument using enclosed reeds fed from a constant reservoir of air in the form of a bag. The Scottish Great Highland bagpipe is well known, but people have played bagpipes for centuries throughout large parts of Europe, North Africa, West Asia, around the Persian Gulf and northern parts of South Asia.

The term bagpipes is also used, though pipers usually refer to the bagpipes as "the pipes", "a set of pipes" or "a stand of pipes".

Bagpipes are part of the aerophone group because to play the instrument, air must be blown into it to produce a sound.

== Construction ==
Skye Boat Song
An adaptation of "The Skye Boat Song" for Great Highland bagpipes played by the Clan Stewart Pipe Band.

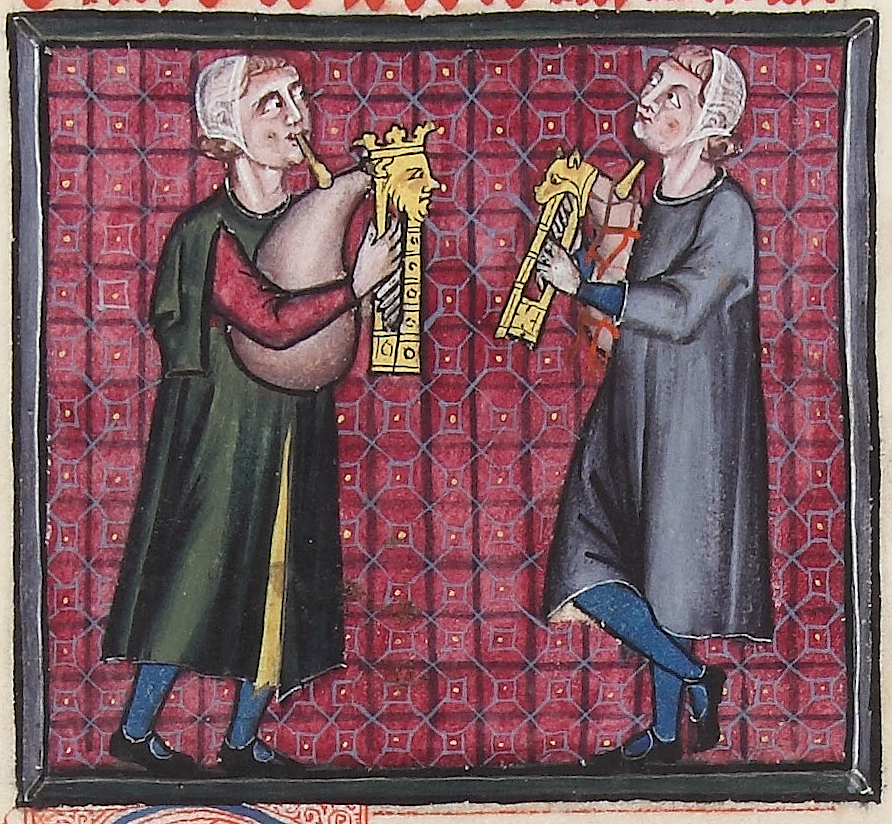
A detail from the Cantigas de Santa Maria showing bagpipes with one chanter and a parallel drone (Spain, 13th century).

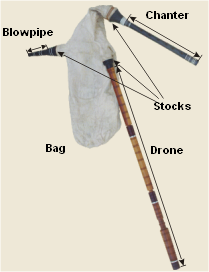
On this Bulgarian gaida, the chanter is the short gray pipe at the top, while the drone is the long three-section pipe.

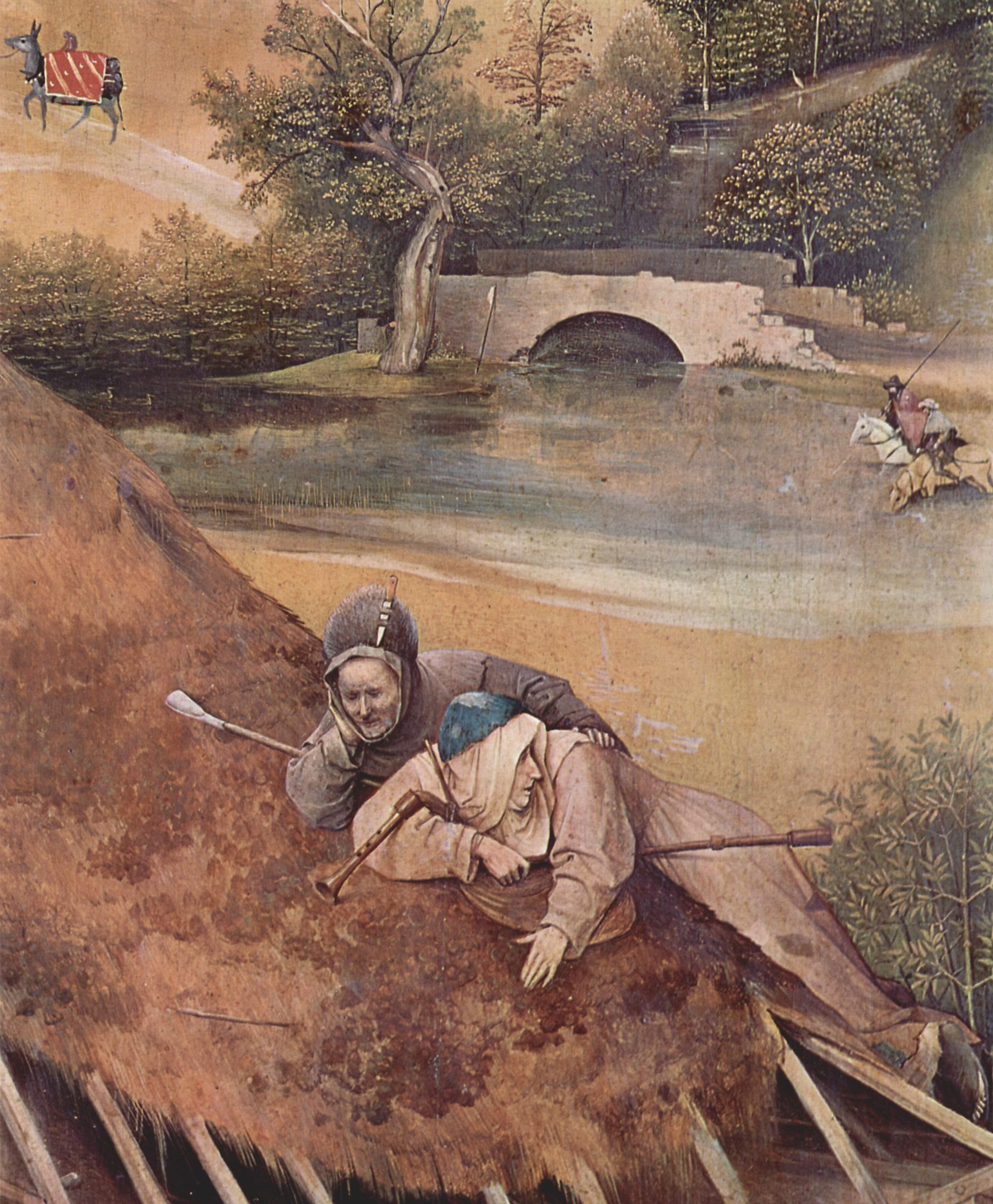
A detail from a painting by Hieronymus Bosch showing two bagpipers (15th century).

A set of bagpipes minimally consists of an air supply, a bag, a chanter, and usually at least one drone. Many bagpipes have more than one drone (and, sometimes, more than one chanter) in various combinations, held in place in stocks—sockets that fasten the various pipes to the bag.

=== Air supply ===
The most common method of supplying air to the bag is through blowing into a blowpipe or blowstick. In some pipes the player must cover the tip of the blowpipe with the tongue while inhaling, in order to prevent unwanted deflation of the bag, but most blowpipes have a non-return valve that eliminates this need. In recent times, there are many instruments that assist in creating a clean air flow to the pipes and assist the collection of condensation.

The use of a bellows to supply air is an innovation dating from the 16th or 17th century. In these pipes, sometimes called "cauld wind pipes", air is not heated or moistened by the player's breathing, so bellows-driven bagpipes can use more refined or delicate reeds. Such pipes include the Irish uilleann pipes; the border or Lowland pipes, Scottish smallpipes, Northumbrian smallpipe and pastoral pipe in Britain; the musette de cour, the musette bechonnet and the cabrette in France; and the Dudy, koziol bialy, and koziol czarny in Poland.

=== Bag ===
The bag is an airtight reservoir that holds air and regulates its flow via arm pressure, allowing the player to maintain continuous, even sound. The player keeps the bag inflated by blowing air into it through a blowpipe or by pumping air into it with a bellows. Materials used for bags vary widely, but the most common are the skins of local animals such as goats, dogs, sheep, and cows. More recently, bags made of synthetic materials including Gore-Tex have become much more common. Some synthetic bags have zips that allow the player to fit a more effective moisture trap to the inside of the bag. However, synthetic bags still carry a risk of colonisation by fungal spores, and the associated danger of lung infection if they are not kept clean, even if they otherwise require less cleaning than do bags made from natural substances.

Bags cut from larger materials are usually saddle-stitched with an extra strip folded over the seam and stitched (for skin bags) or glued (for synthetic bags) to reduce leaks. Holes are then cut to accommodate the stocks. In the case of bags made from largely intact animal skins, the stocks are typically tied into the points where the limbs and the head joined the body of the whole animal, a construction technique common in Central Europe. Different regions have different ways of treating the hide. The simplest methods involve just the use of salt, while more complex treatments involve milk, flour, and the removal of fur. The hide is normally turned inside out so that the fur is on the inside of the bag, as this helps to reduce the effect of moisture buildup within the bag.

=== Chanter ===
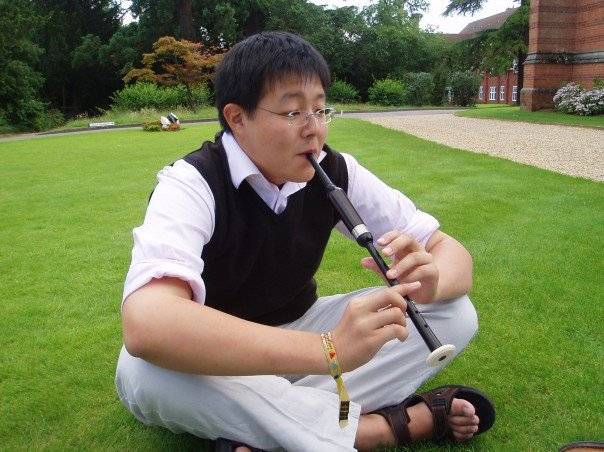
A Great Highland bagpipe practice chanter

The chanter is the melody pipe, played with two hands. All bagpipes have at least one chanter; some pipes have two chanters, particularly those in North Africa, in the Balkans, and in Southwest Asia. A chanter can be bored internally so that the inside walls are parallel (or "cylindrical") for its full length, or it can be bored in a conical shape. Popular woods include boxwood, cornel, plum or other fruit wood.

The chanter is usually open-ended, so there is no easy way for the player to stop the pipe from sounding. Thus most bagpipes share a constant legato sound with no rests in the music. Primarily because of this inability to stop playing, technical movements are made to break up notes and to create the illusion of articulation and accents. Because of their importance, these embellishments (or "ornaments") are often highly technical systems specific to each bagpipe, and take many years of study to master. A few bagpipes (such as the musette de cour, the uilleann pipes, the Northumbrian smallpipes, the piva and the left chanter of the surdelina) have closed ends or stop the end on the player's leg, so that when the player "closes" (covers all the holes), the chanter becomes silent.

A practice chanter is a chanter without bag or drones and has a much quieter reed, allowing a player to practice the instrument quietly and with no variables other than playing the chanter.

The term chanter is derived from the Latin cantare, or "to sing", much like the modern French verb meaning "to sing", chanter.

A distinctive feature of the gaida's chanter (which it shares with a number of other Eastern European bagpipes) is the "flea-hole" (also known as a mumbler or voicer, marmorka) which is covered by the index finger of the left hand. The flea-hole is smaller than the rest and usually consists of a small tube that is made out of metal or a chicken or duck feather. Uncovering the flea-hole raises any note played by a half step, and it is used in creating the musical ornamentation that gives Balkan music its unique character.

Some types of gaida can have a double bored chanter, such as the Serbian three-voiced gajde. It has eight fingerholes: the top four are covered by the thumb and the first three fingers of the left hand, then the four fingers of the right hand cover the remaining four holes.

==== Chanter reed ====
The note from the chanter is produced by a reed installed at its top. The reed may be a single (a reed with one vibrating tongue) or double reed (of two pieces that vibrate against each other). Double reeds are used with both conical- and parallel-bored chanters while single reeds are generally (although not exclusively) limited to parallel-bored chanters. In general, double-reed chanters are found in pipes of Western Europe while single-reed chanters appear in most other regions.

They are made from reed (arundo donax or Phragmites), bamboo, or elder. A more modern variant for the reed is a combination of a cotton phenolic (Hgw2082) material from which the body of the reed is made and a clarinet reed cut to size in order to fit the body. These types of reeds produce a louder sound and are not so sensitive to humidity and temperature changes.

=== Drone ===
Most bagpipes have at least one drone, a pipe that generally is not fingered but rather produces a constant harmonizing note throughout play (usually the tonic note of the chanter). Exceptions are generally those pipes that have a double-chanter instead. A drone is most commonly a cylindrically bored tube with a single reed, although drones with double reeds exist. The drone is generally designed in two or more parts with a sliding joint so that the pitch of the drone can be adjusted.

Depending on the type of pipes, the drones may lie over the shoulder, across the arm opposite the bag, or may run parallel to the chanter. Some drones have a tuning screw, which effectively alters the length of the drone by opening a hole, allowing the drone to be tuned to two or more distinct pitches. The tuning screw may also shut off the drone altogether. In most types of pipes with one drone, it is pitched two octaves below the tonic of the chanter. Additional drones often add the octave below and then a drone consonant with the fifth of the chanter.

== History ==
=== Possible ancient origins ===
The evidence for bagpipes prior to the 13th century is still uncertain, but several textual and visual clues have been suggested. The Oxford History of Music posits that a sculpture of bagpipes has been found on a Hittite slab at Euyuk in Anatolia, dated to 1000 BC. Another interpretation of this sculpture suggests that it instead depicts a pan flute played along with a friction drum.

Several authors identify the ancient Greek askaulos (ἀσκός askos – wine-skin, αὐλός aulos – reed pipe) with the bagpipe.

Dio Chrysostom wrote in the 1st century AD of a contemporary sovereign (possibly the Roman emperor Nero) who could play a pipe (tibia, Roman reedpipes similar to Greek and Etruscan instruments) with his mouth as well as by tucking a bladder beneath his armpit.

In the 2nd century AD, Suetonius also described Nero as a player of the tibia utricularis.

Modern scholarship suggests that such instruments, rather than being seen as an independent class, were understood as variants on mouth-blown instruments that used a bag as an alternative blowing aid, and that it was not until drones were added in the European Medieval era that bagpipes were seen as a distinct class.

=== Spread and development in Europe ===
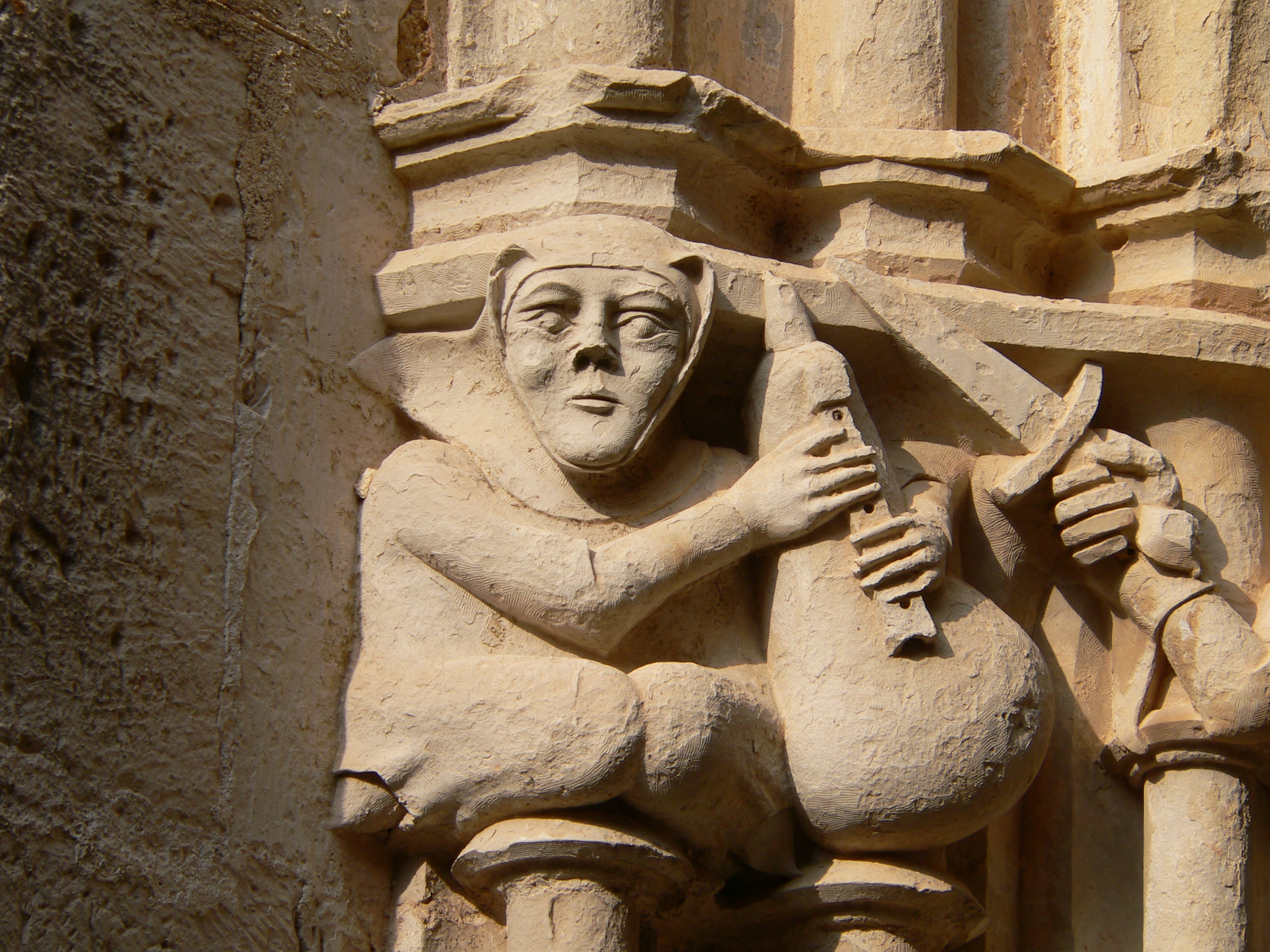
Medieval bagpiper at the Cistercian monastery of Santes Creus, Catalonia, Spain

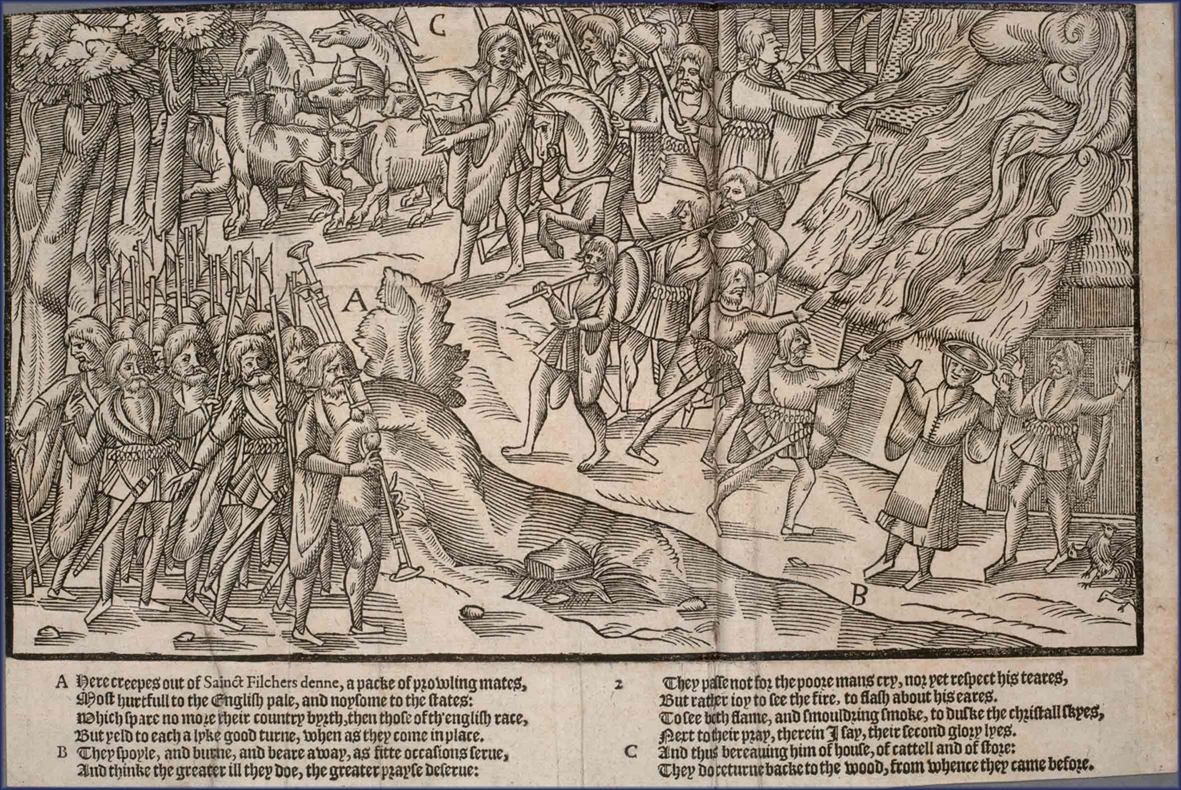
Image of Irelande, Military use of the bagpipe (1581)

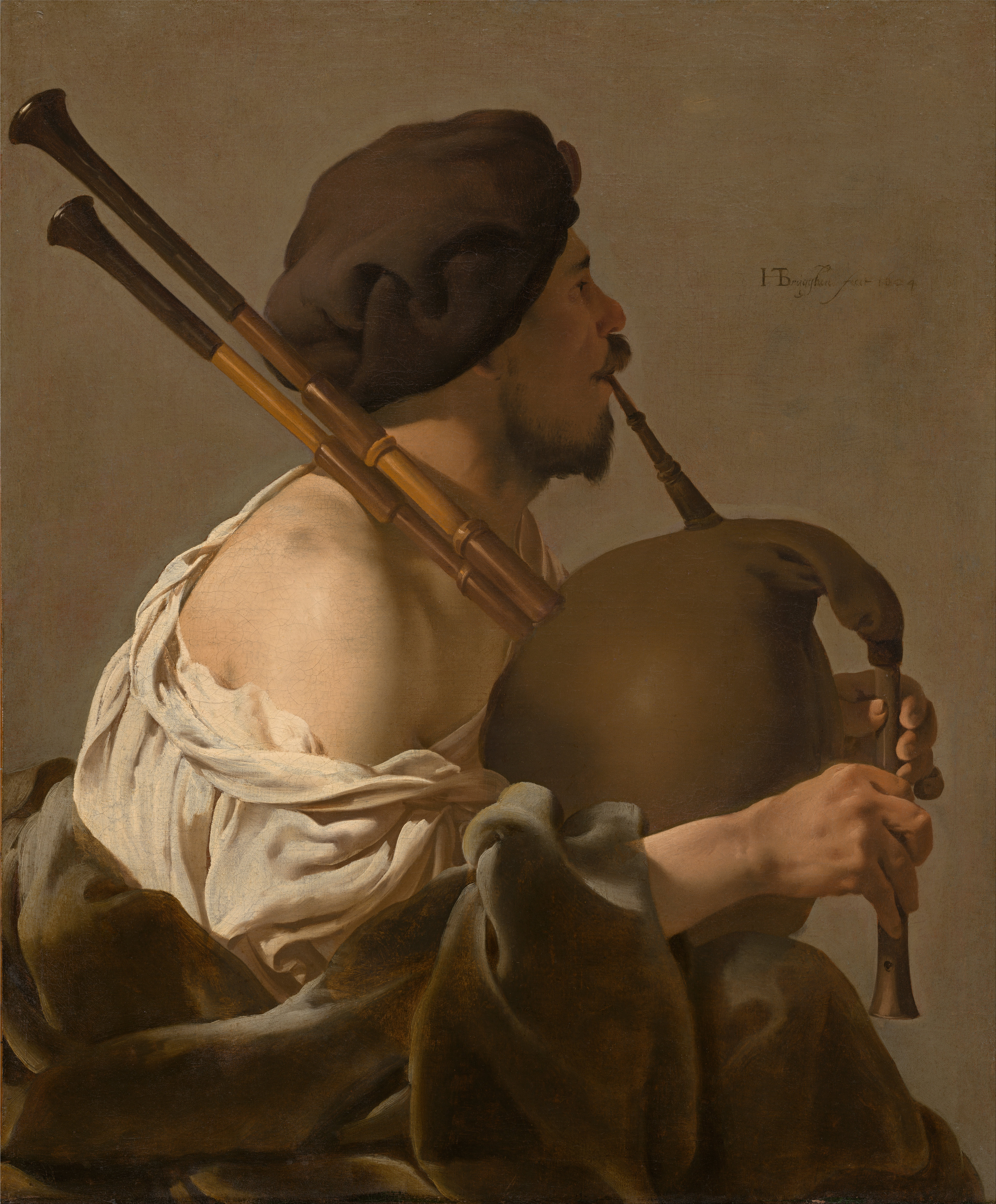
De doedelzakspeler ("Bagpipe Player"), Hendrick ter Brugghen (1624)

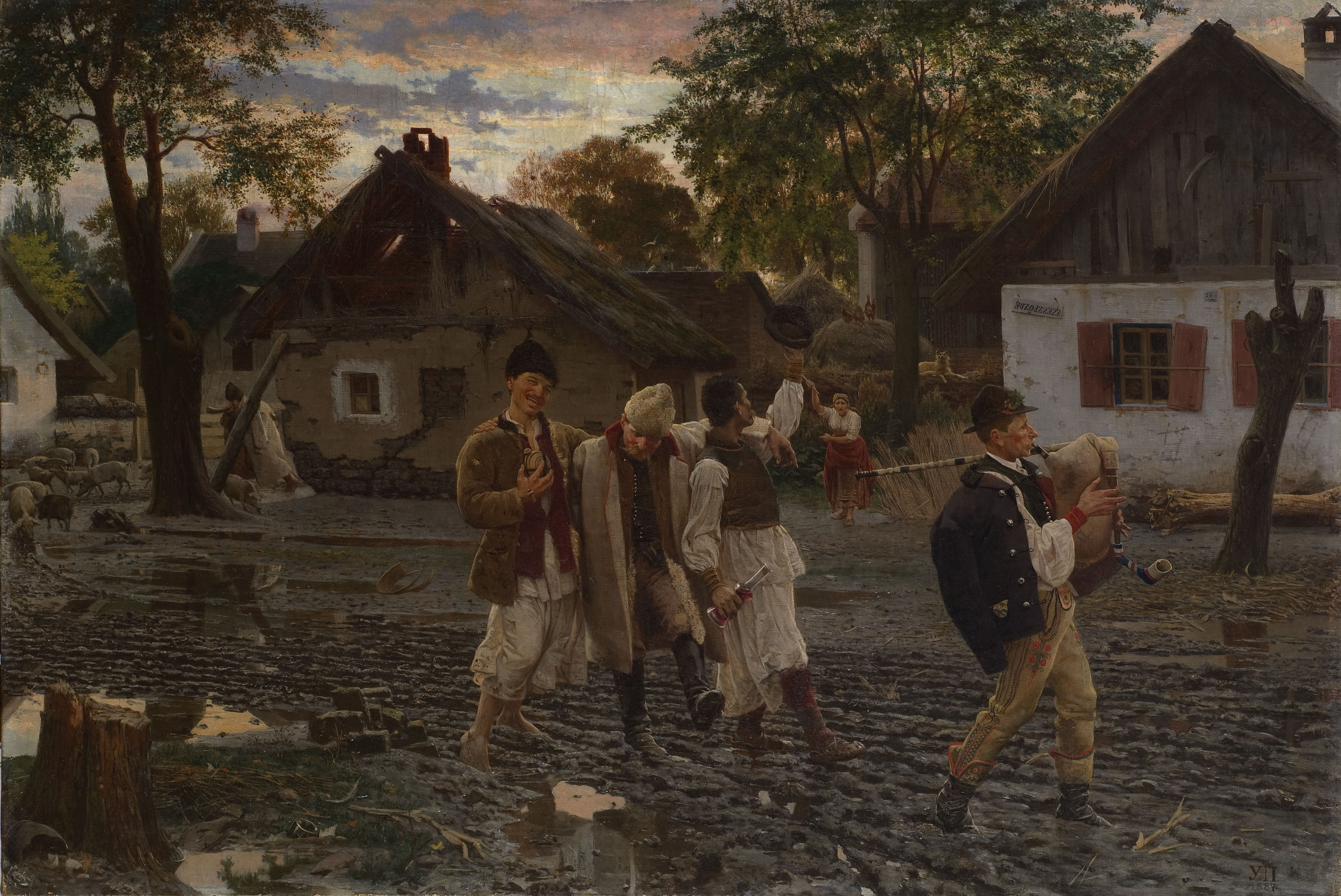
Happy Brothers by Uroš Predić (1887)

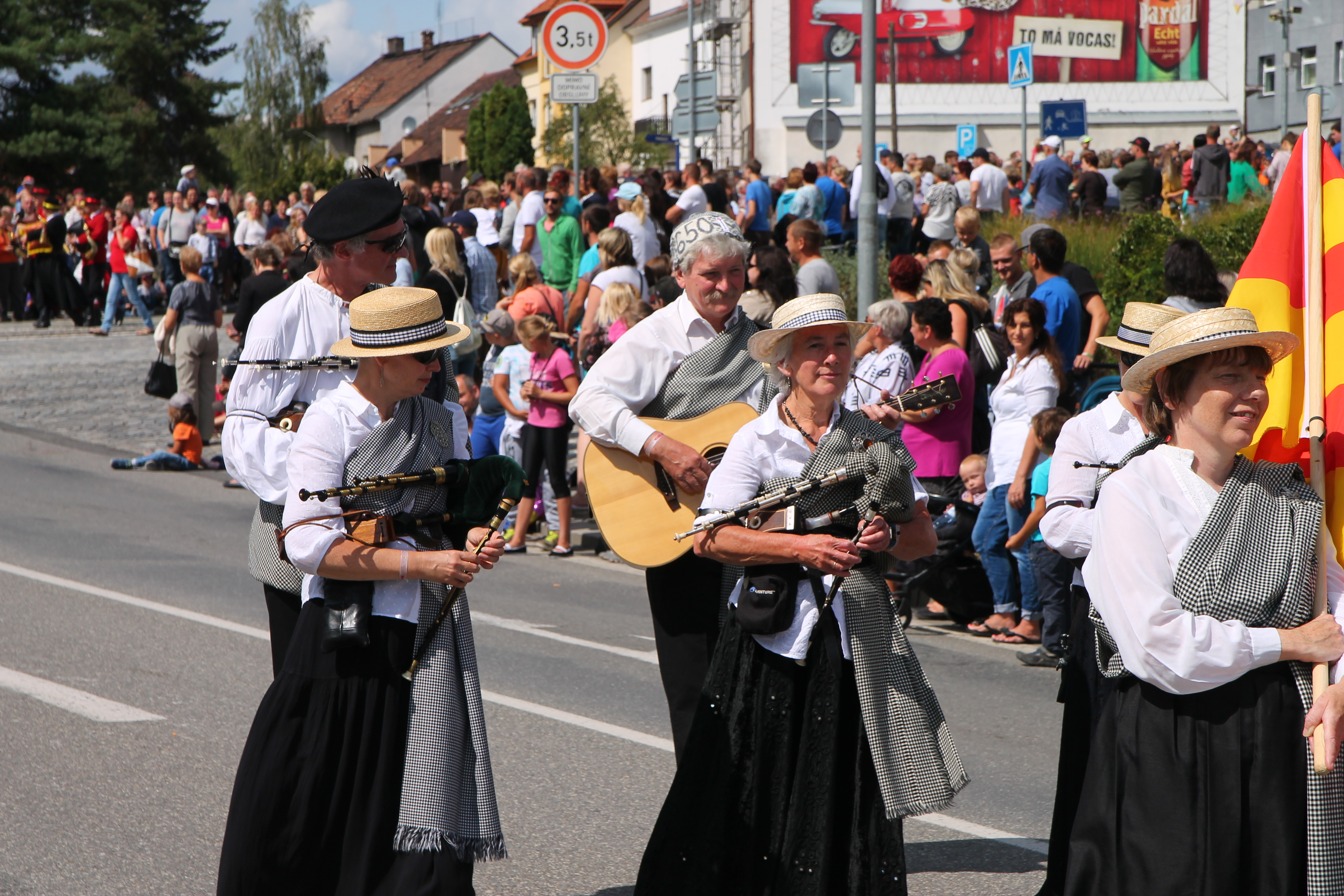
International Bagpipe Festival, Strakonice (2018)

In the early part of the second millennium, representations of bagpipes began to appear with increasing frequency in Western European art and iconography. The Cantigas de Santa Maria, written in Galician-Portuguese and compiled in Castile in the mid-13th century, depicts several types of bagpipes.

Several illustrations of bagpipes also appear in the Chronique dite de Baudoin d'Avesnes, a 13th-century manuscript of northern French origin.

Although evidence of bagpipes in the British Isles prior to the 14th century is contested, they are explicitly mentioned in The Canterbury Tales (written around 1380):

A baggepype wel coude he blowe and sowne, /And ther-with-al he broghte us out of towne.

— Canterbury Tales

Bagpipes were also frequent subjects for carvers of wooden choir stalls in the late 15th and early 16th century throughout Europe, sometimes with animal musicians.

Actual specimens of bagpipes from before the 18th century are extremely rare; however, a substantial number of paintings, carvings, engravings, and manuscript illuminations survive. These artefacts are clear evidence that bagpipes varied widely throughout Europe, and even within individual regions. Many examples of early folk bagpipes in continental Europe can be found in the paintings of Brueghel, Teniers, Jordaens, and Durer.

The earliest known artefact identified as a part of a bagpipe is a chanter found in 1985 at Rostock, Germany, that has been dated to the late 14th century or the first quarter of the 15th century.

The first clear reference to the use of the Scottish Highland bagpipe is from a French history that mentions their use at the Battle of Pinkie in 1547. George Buchanan (1506–82) claimed that the bagpipe had replaced the trumpet on the battlefield. This period saw the creation of the ceòl mór (great music) of the bagpipe, which reflected its martial origins, with battle tunes, marches, gatherings, salutes and laments. The Highlands of the early 17th century saw the development of piping families including the MacCrimmonds, MacArthurs, MacGregors, and the Mackays of Gairloch.

The earliest Irish mention of the bagpipe is in 1206, approximately thirty years after the Anglo-Norman invasion; another mention attributes their use to Irish troops in Henry VIII's siege of Boulogne. Illustrations in the 1581 book The Image of Irelande by John Derricke clearly depict a bagpiper. Derricke's illustrations are considered to be reasonably faithful depictions of the attire and equipment of the English and Irish population of the 16th century.

The "Battell" sequence from My Ladye Nevells Booke (1591) by William Byrd, which probably alludes to the Irish wars of 1578, contains a piece entitled The bagpipe: & the drone. In 1760, the first serious study of the Scottish Highland bagpipe and its music was attempted in Joseph MacDonald's Compleat Theory. A manuscript from the 1730s by a William Dixon of Northumberland contains music that fits the border pipe, a nine-note bellows-blown bagpipe with a chanter similar to that of the modern Great Highland bagpipe. However, the music in Dixon's manuscript varied greatly from modern Highland bagpipe tunes, consisting mostly of extended variation sets of common dance tunes. Some of the tunes in the Dixon manuscript correspond to those found in the early 19th-century manuscript sources of Northumbrian smallpipe tunes, notably the rare book of 50 tunes, many with variations, by John Peacock.

As Western classical music developed, both in terms of musical sophistication and instrumental technology, bagpipes in many regions fell out of favour because of their limited range and function. This triggered a long, slow decline that continued, in most cases, into the 20th century.

Extensive and documented collections of traditional bagpipes may be found at the Metropolitan Museum of Art in New York City, the International Bagpipe Museum in Gijón, Spain, the Pitt Rivers Museum in Oxford, England and the Morpeth Chantry Bagpipe Museum in Northumberland, and the Musical Instrument Museum in Phoenix, Arizona.

The International Bagpipe Festival is held every two years in Strakonice, Czech Republic.

=== Recent history ===
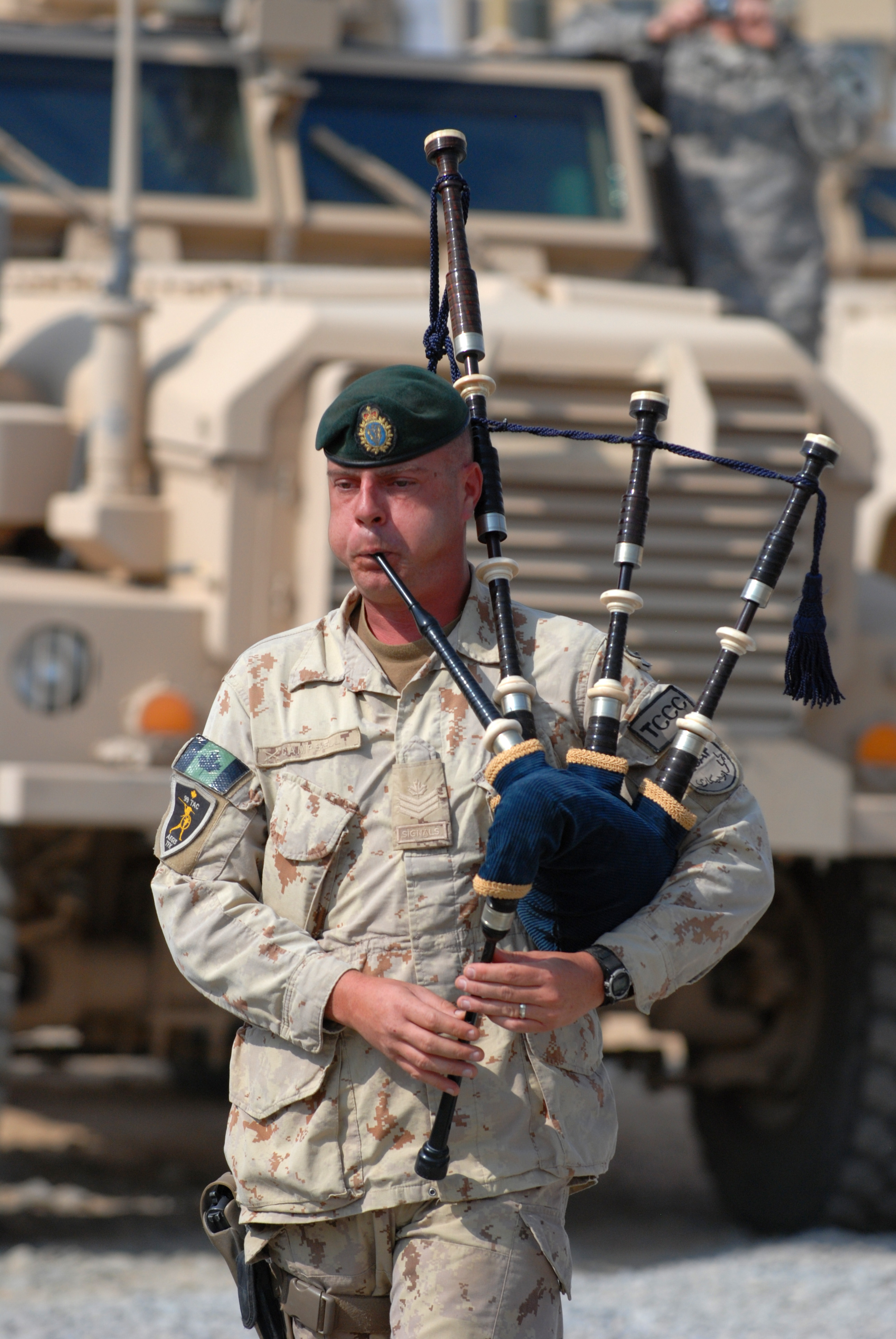
A Canadian soldier plays the bagpipes during the war in Afghanistan. Bagpipes are frequently used during funerals and memorials, especially among fire department, military and police forces in the United Kingdom, Ireland, the Commonwealth realms, and the U.S.

During the 19th and 20th centuries, as a result of the participation of Scottish regiments in the expansion of the British Empire, the bagpipe became well known worldwide. This surge in the bagpipe's popularity was boosted by large numbers of Allied pipers which served in World War I and World War II. This coincided with a decline in the popularity of many traditional forms of bagpipe throughout Europe, which began to be displaced by instruments from the classical tradition and later by gramophone and radio.

As pipers were easily identifiable, combat losses were high, estimated at one thousand in World War I. A front line role was prohibited following high losses in the Second Battle of El Alamein in 1943, though a few later instances occurred.

In the United Kingdom and Commonwealth Nations such as Canada, New Zealand and Australia, the Great Highland bagpipe is commonly used in the military and is often played during formal ceremonies. Foreign militaries patterned after the British army have also adopted the Highland bagpipe, including those of Uganda, Sudan, India, Pakistan, Sri Lanka, Jordan, and Oman. Many police and fire services in Scotland, Canada, Australia, New Zealand, Hong Kong, and the United States have also adopted the tradition of fielding pipe bands.

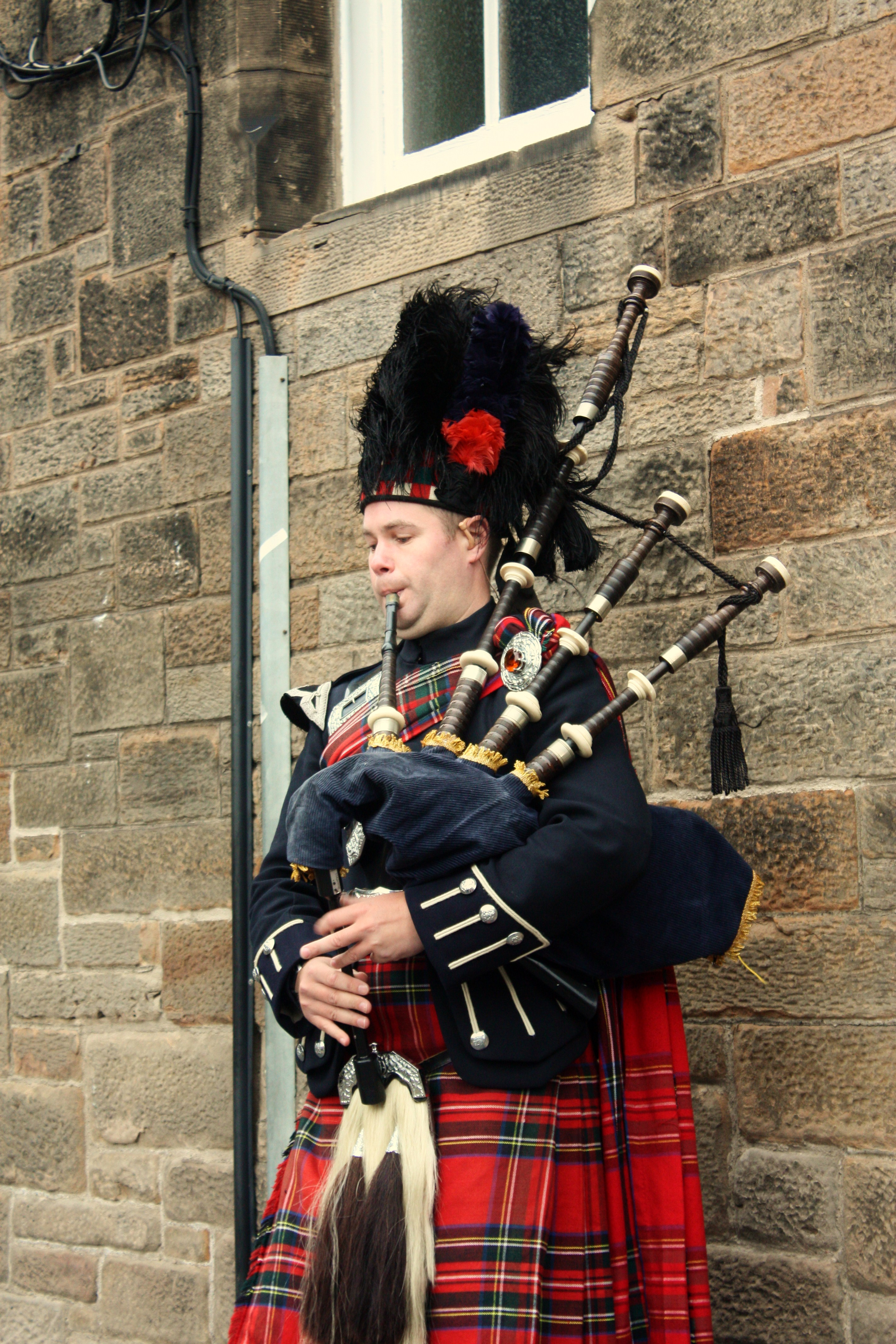
A bagpiper busking with the Great Highland bagpipe on the street in Edinburgh, Scotland

In recent years, often driven by revivals of native folk music and dance, many types of bagpipe have enjoyed a resurgence in popularity and, in many cases, instruments that had fallen into obscurity have become extremely popular. In Brittany, the Great Highland bagpipe and concept of the pipe band were appropriated to create a Breton interpretation known as the bagad. The pipe-band idiom has also been adopted and applied to the Galician gaita as well. Bagpipes have often been used in various films depicting moments from Scottish and Irish history; the film Braveheart and the theatrical show Riverdance have served to make the uilleann pipe more commonly known.

The bagpipe is sometimes played at formal events at Commonwealth universities, particularly in Canada. Because of Scottish influences on the sport of curling, the bagpipe is also the official instrument of the World Curling Federation and is commonly played during a ceremonial procession of teams before major curling championships.

Bagpipe making was once a craft that produced instruments in many distinctive, local and traditional styles. Today, the world's largest producer of the instrument is Pakistan, where the industry was worth $6.8 million in 2010. In the late 20th century, various models of electronic bagpipes were invented. The first custom-built MIDI bagpipes were developed by the Asturian piper known as Hevia (José Ángel Hevia Velasco).

Bagpipes players from The City Of Auckland Pipe Band

Astronaut Kjell N. Lindgren is thought to be the first person to play the bagpipe in outer space, having played "Amazing Grace" in tribute to late research scientist Victor Hurst aboard the International Space Station in November 2015.

Traditionally, one of the purposes of the bagpipe was to provide music for dancing. This has declined with the growth of dance bands, recordings, and the decline of traditional dance. In turn, this has led to many types of pipes developing a performance-led tradition, and indeed much modern music based on the dance music tradition played on bagpipes is suitable for use as dance music.

== Modern usage ==
=== Types of bagpipe ===
Numerous types of bagpipe today are widely spread across Europe, the Middle East and North Africa as well as through much of the former British Empire. The name bagpipe has almost become synonymous with its best-known form, the Great Highland bagpipe, overshadowing the great number and variety of traditional forms of bagpipe. Despite the decline of these other types of pipes over the last few centuries, in recent years many of these pipes have seen a resurgence or revival as musicians have sought them out; for example, the Irish piping tradition, which by the mid 20th century had declined to a handful of master players is today alive, well, and flourishing, a situation similar to that of the Asturian gaita, the Galician gaita, the Portuguese gaita transmontana, the Aragonese gaita de boto, Northumbrian smallpipe, the Breton biniou, the Balkan gaida, the Romanian cimpoi, the Black Sea tulum, the Scottish smallpipes and pastoral pipe, as well as other varieties. Bulgaria has the Kaba gaida, a large bagpipe of the Rhodope Mountains with a hexagonal and rounded drone, often described as a deep-sounding gaida and the Dzhura gaida with a straight conical drone and of a higher pitch. The Macedonian gaida is structurally between a kaba and dzhura gaida and described as a medium pitched gaida.

In Southeastern Europe and Eastern Europe bagpipes known as gaida include: the Albanian: gajde, mishnica, bishnica, Aromanian: gaidã, Bulgarian: гайда (gaida), Greek: γκάιντα (gáida) τσαμπούνα (tsaboúna) or ασκομαντουρα (askomandoura), Macedonian: гајда (gajda), Serbo-Croatian: gajda/гајда, Turkish: gayda also tulum and Ukrainian: gayda / ґайда.

In Tunisia, it is known by the name "mezwed". It is used in the Tunisian pop music genre, also called mezwed, that is named after the instrument.

==== Gallery ====
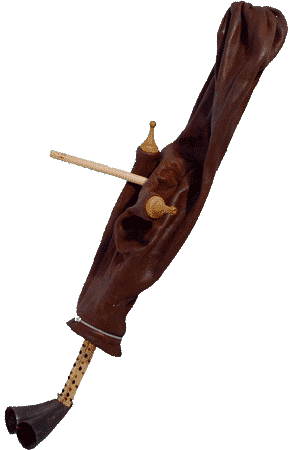
A Tunisian mizwad. Note the small, slender shape.

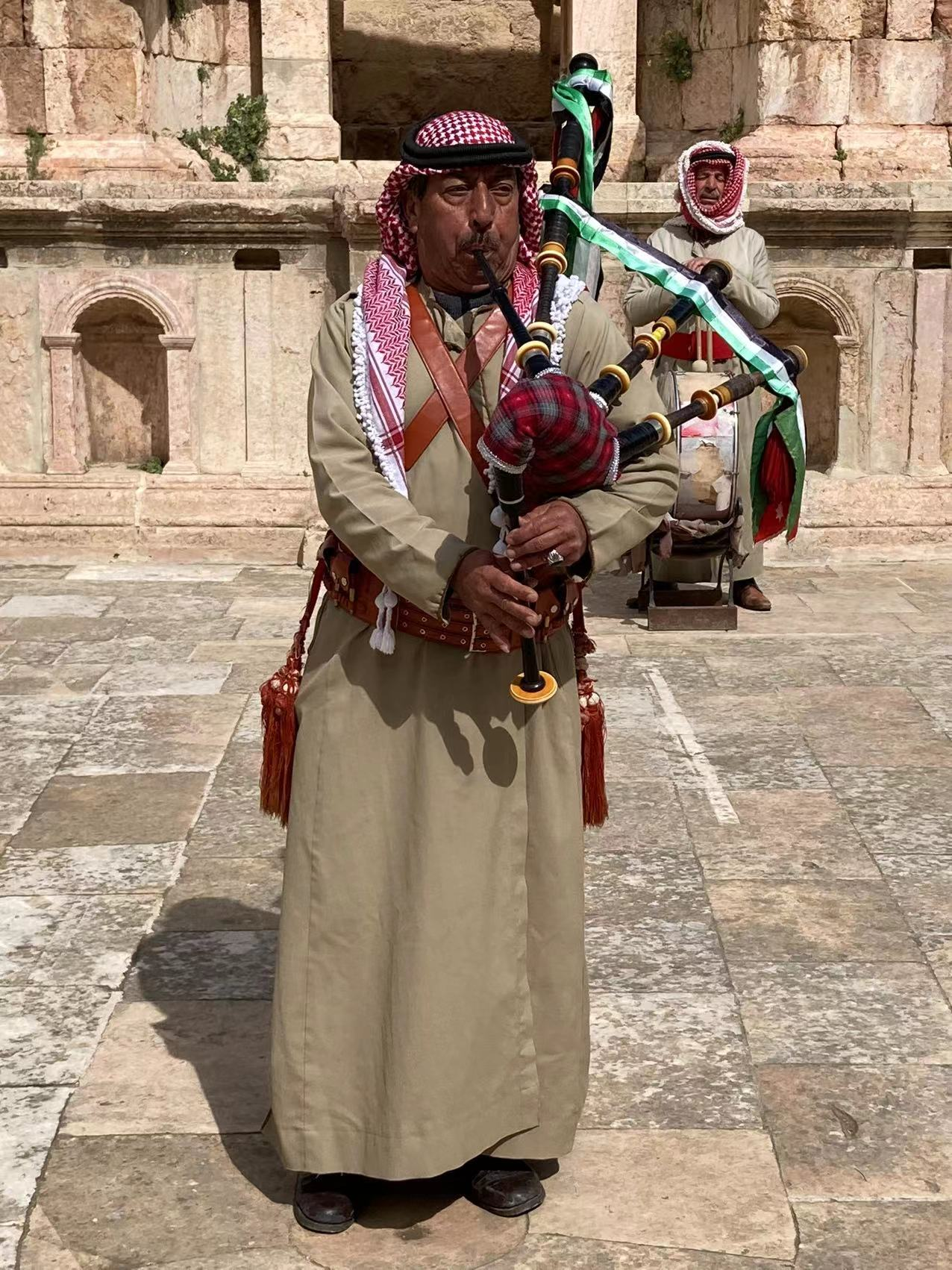
Piper in Jerash, Jordan

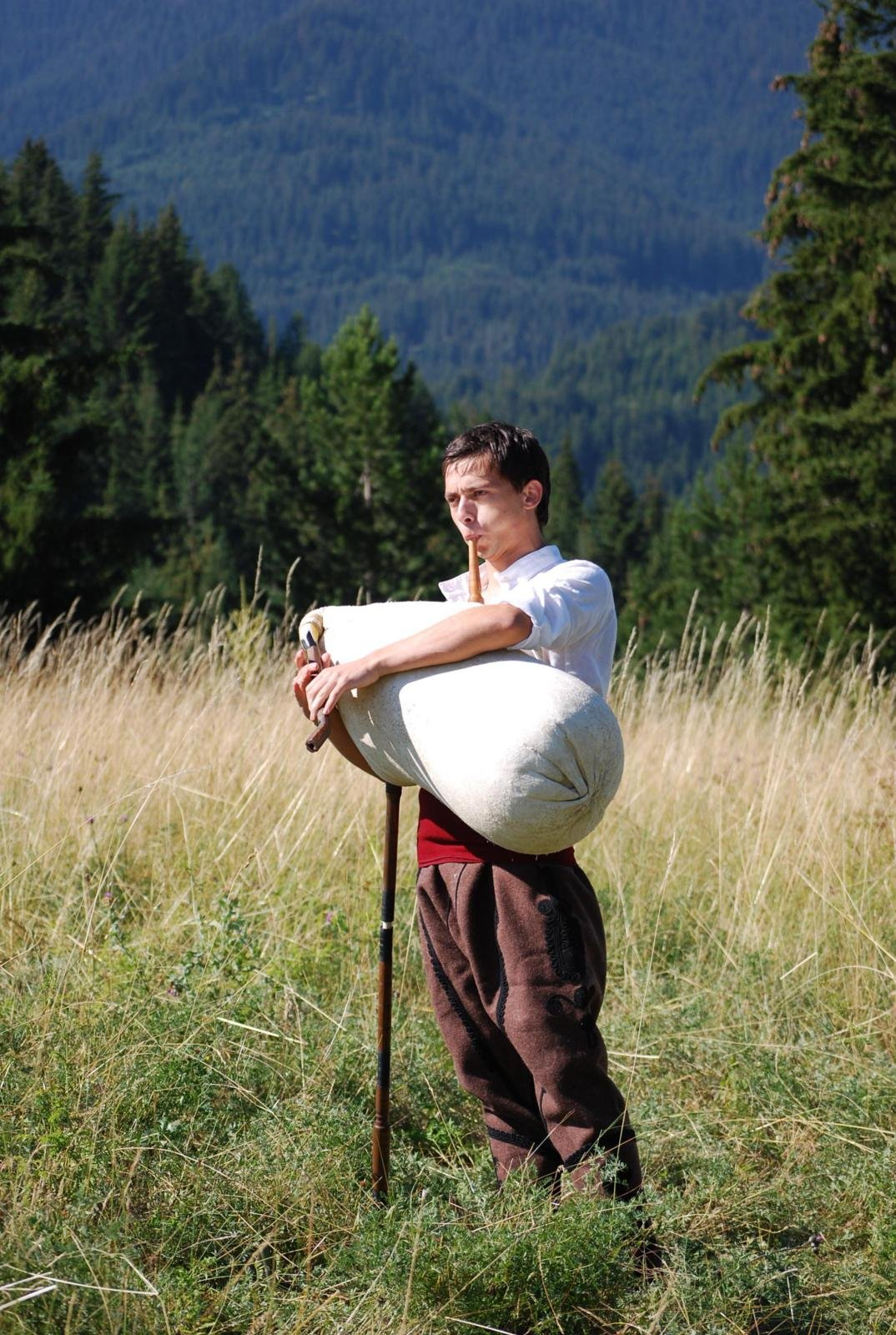
Kaba gaida player from Bulgaria

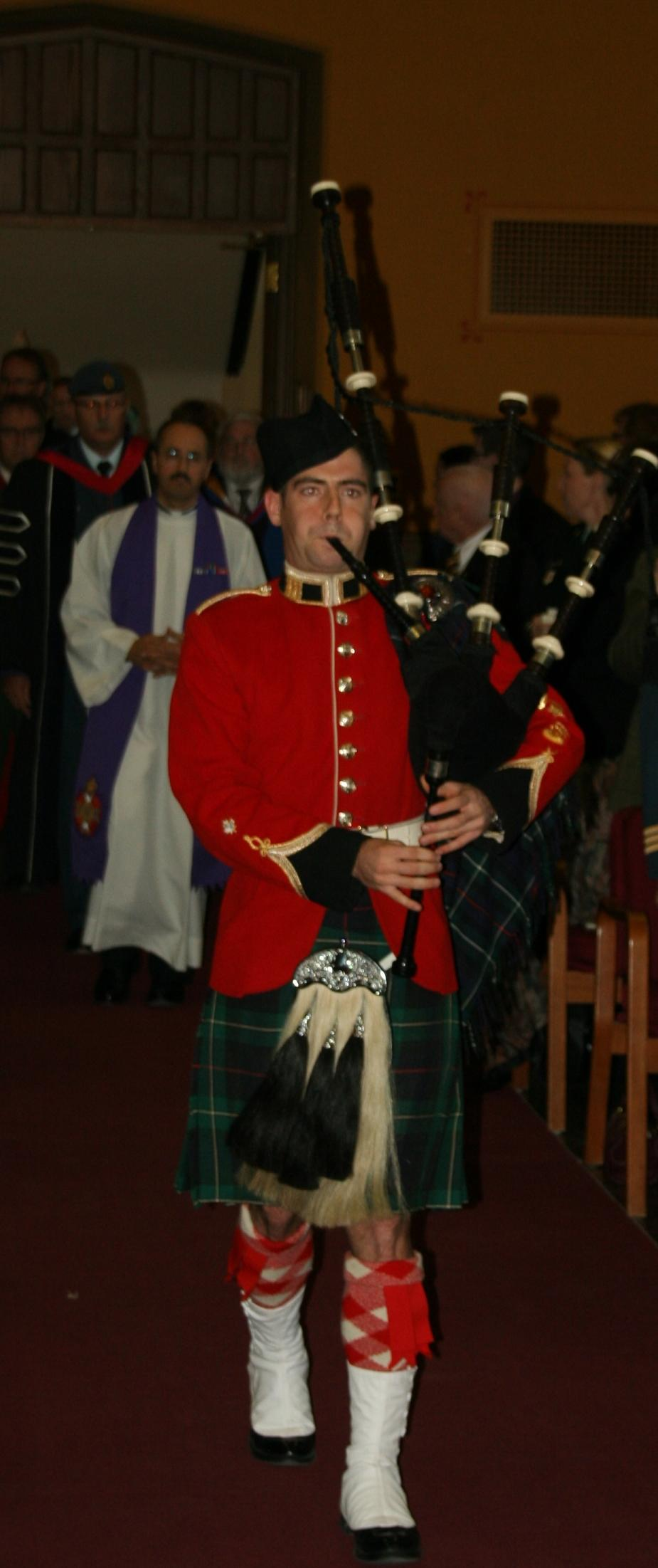
The Scottish Great Highland bagpipe played at a Canadian military function

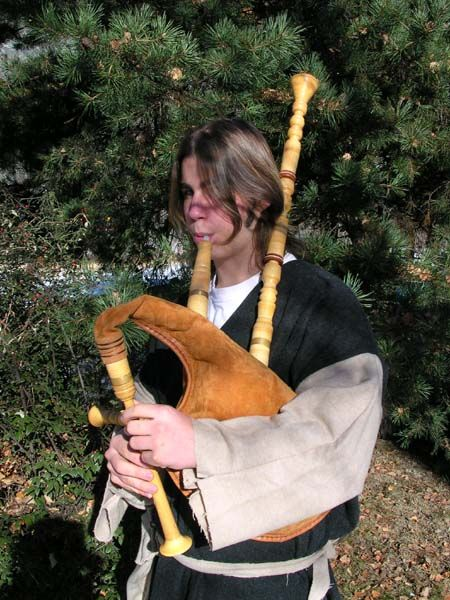
A musician with a Northern Italian Baghèt wearing traditional dress

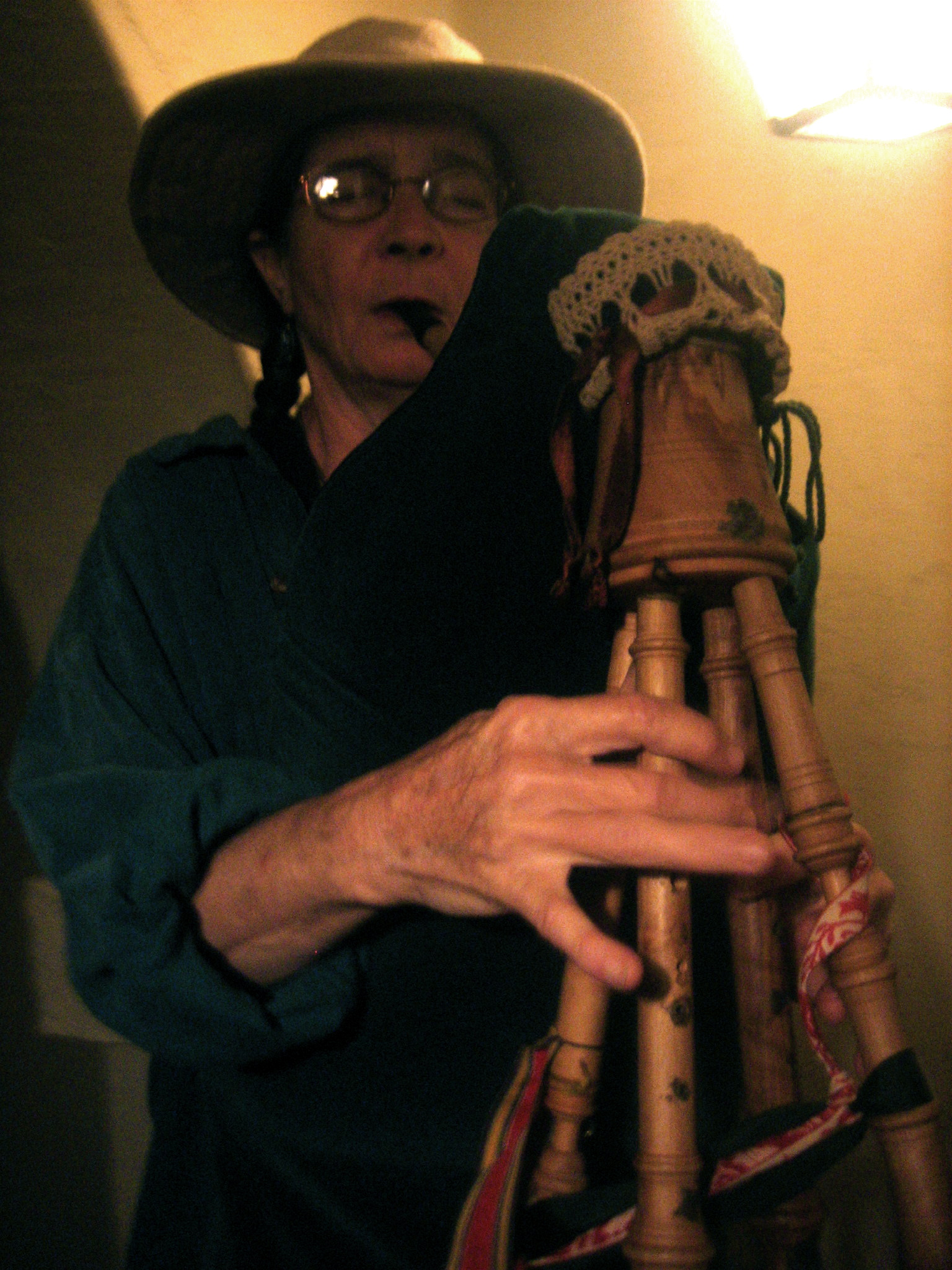
Central and southern Italian zampogna

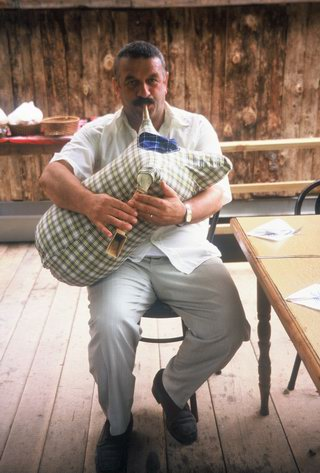
Laz man from Turkey playing a tulum

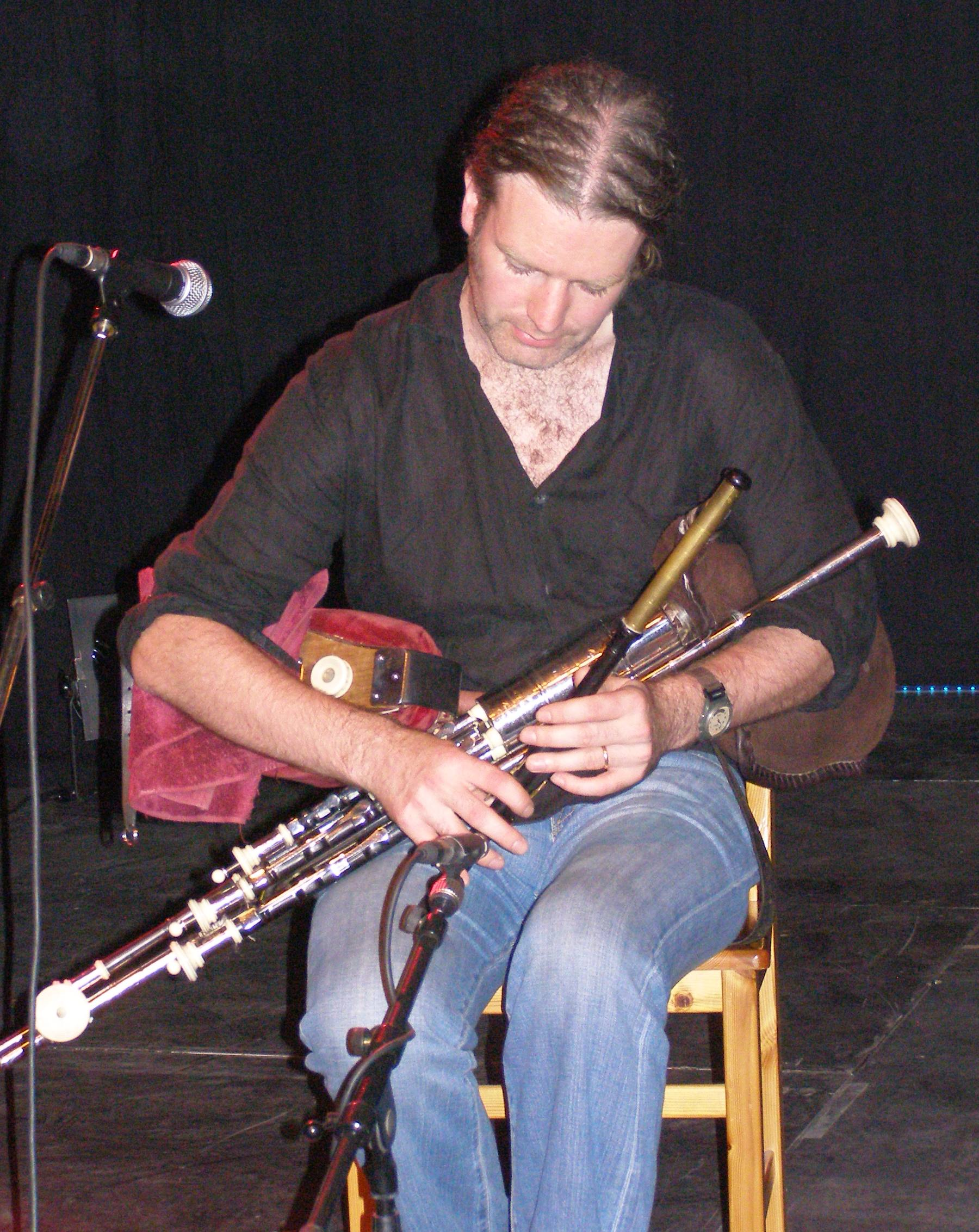
Cillian Vallely playing Irish Uilleann pipes

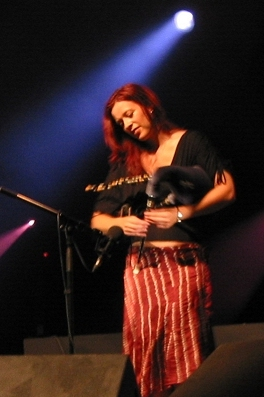
Kathryn Tickell playing Northumbrian smallpipes

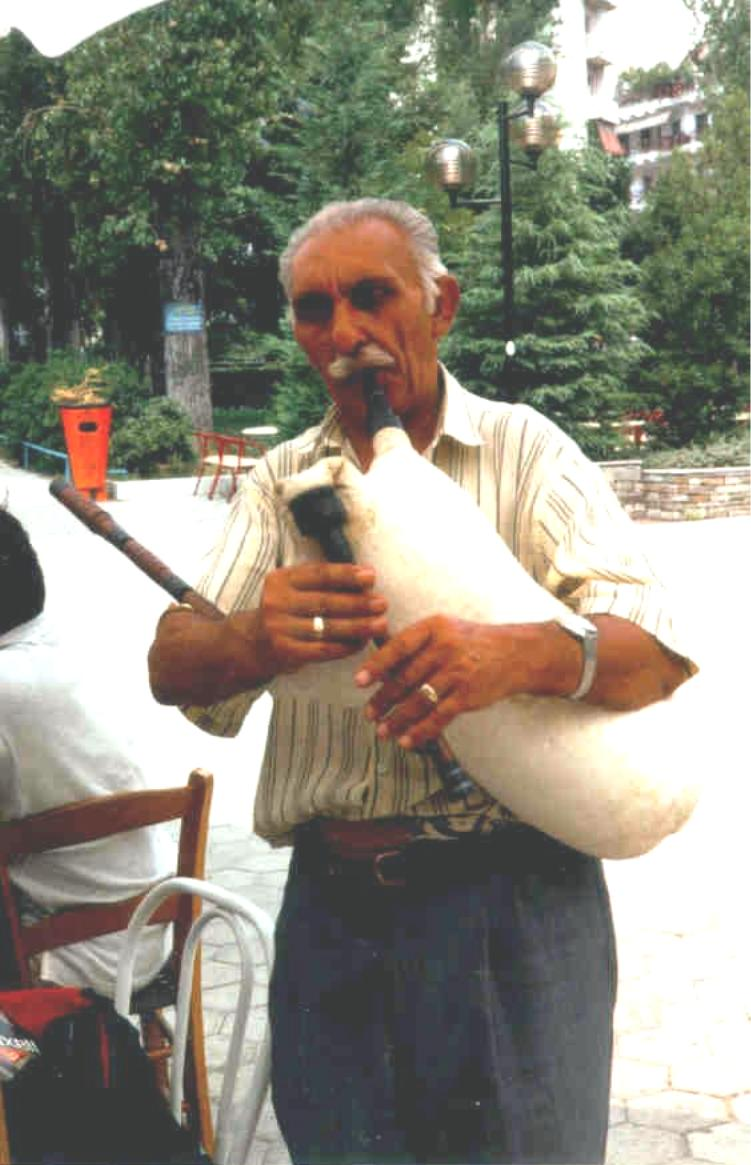
Man from Skopje, North Macedonia playing the Gaida

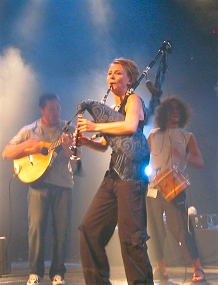
Galician gaita

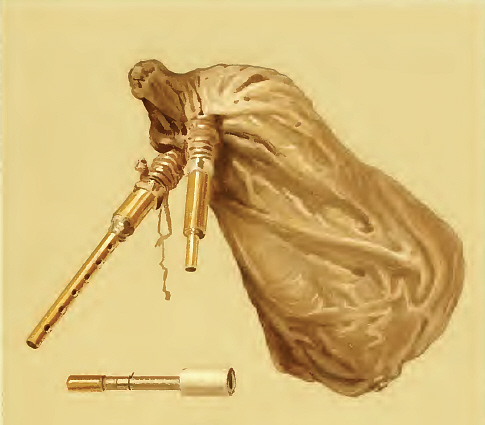
Sruti upanga, a Southern Indian bagpipe

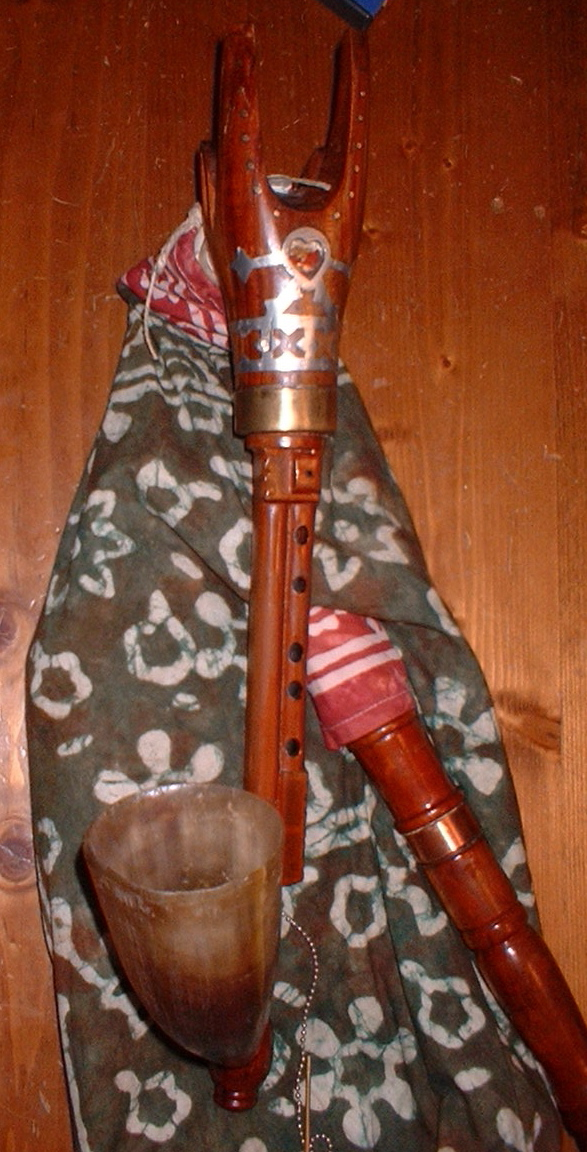
Hungarian duda

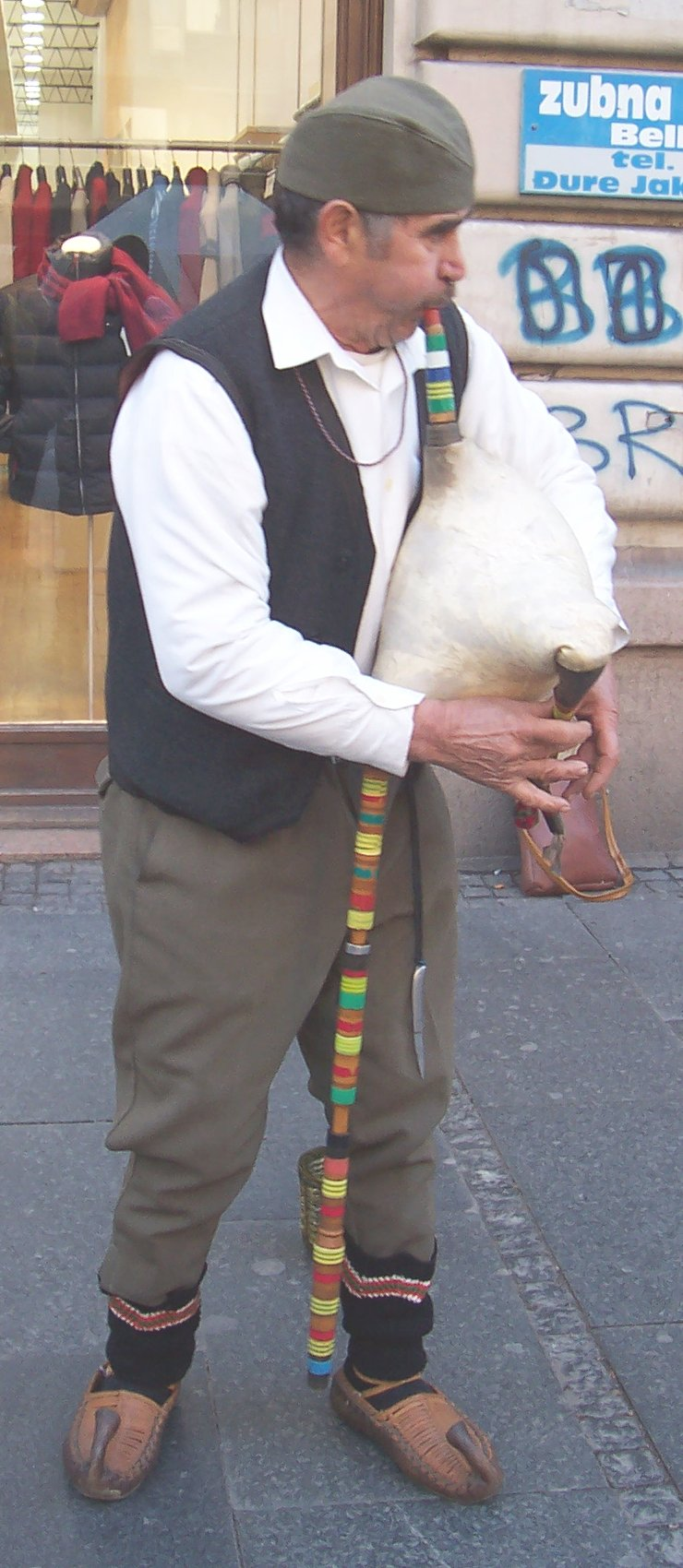
Serbian piper

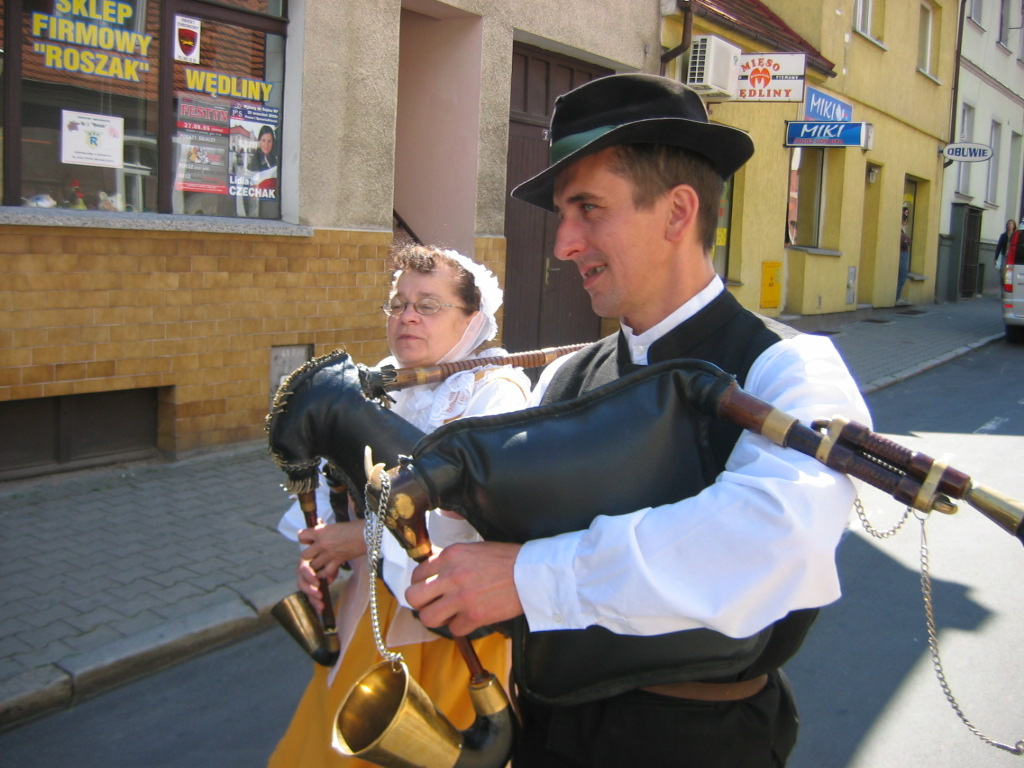
Polish pipers

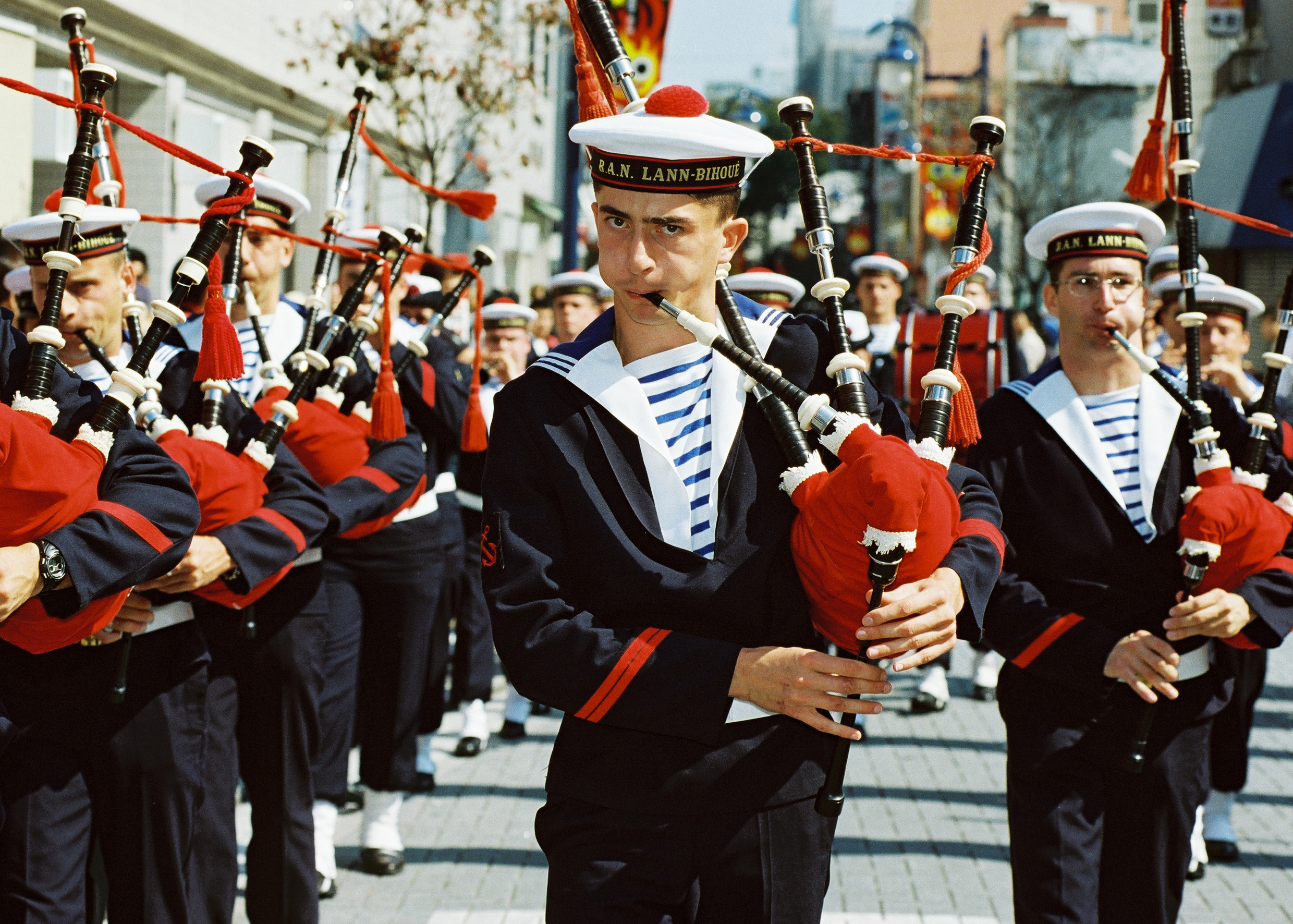
Bagad of Lann Bihoué from the French Navy

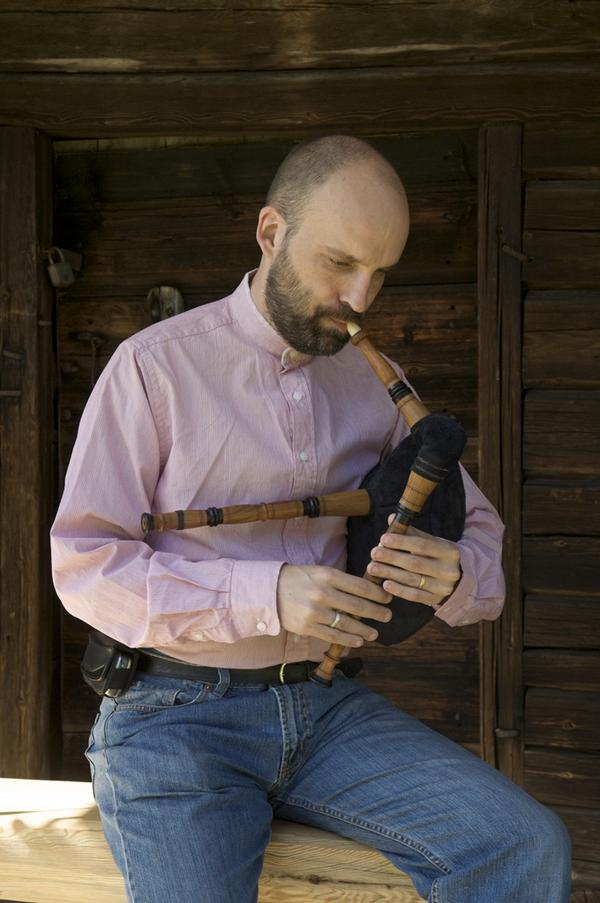
Swedish säckpipa

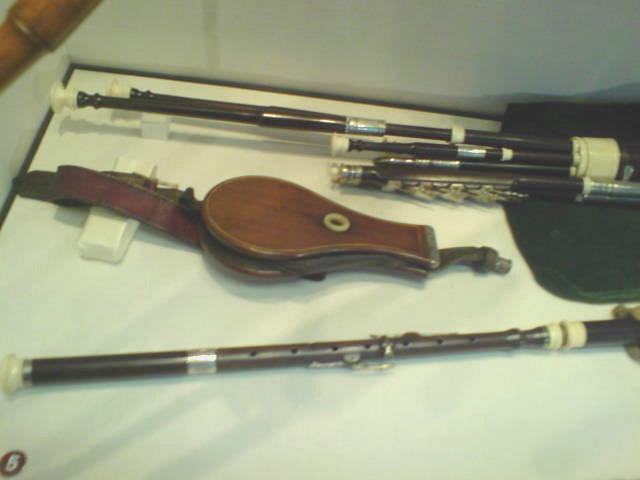
Pastoral pipes with removable footjoint and bellows

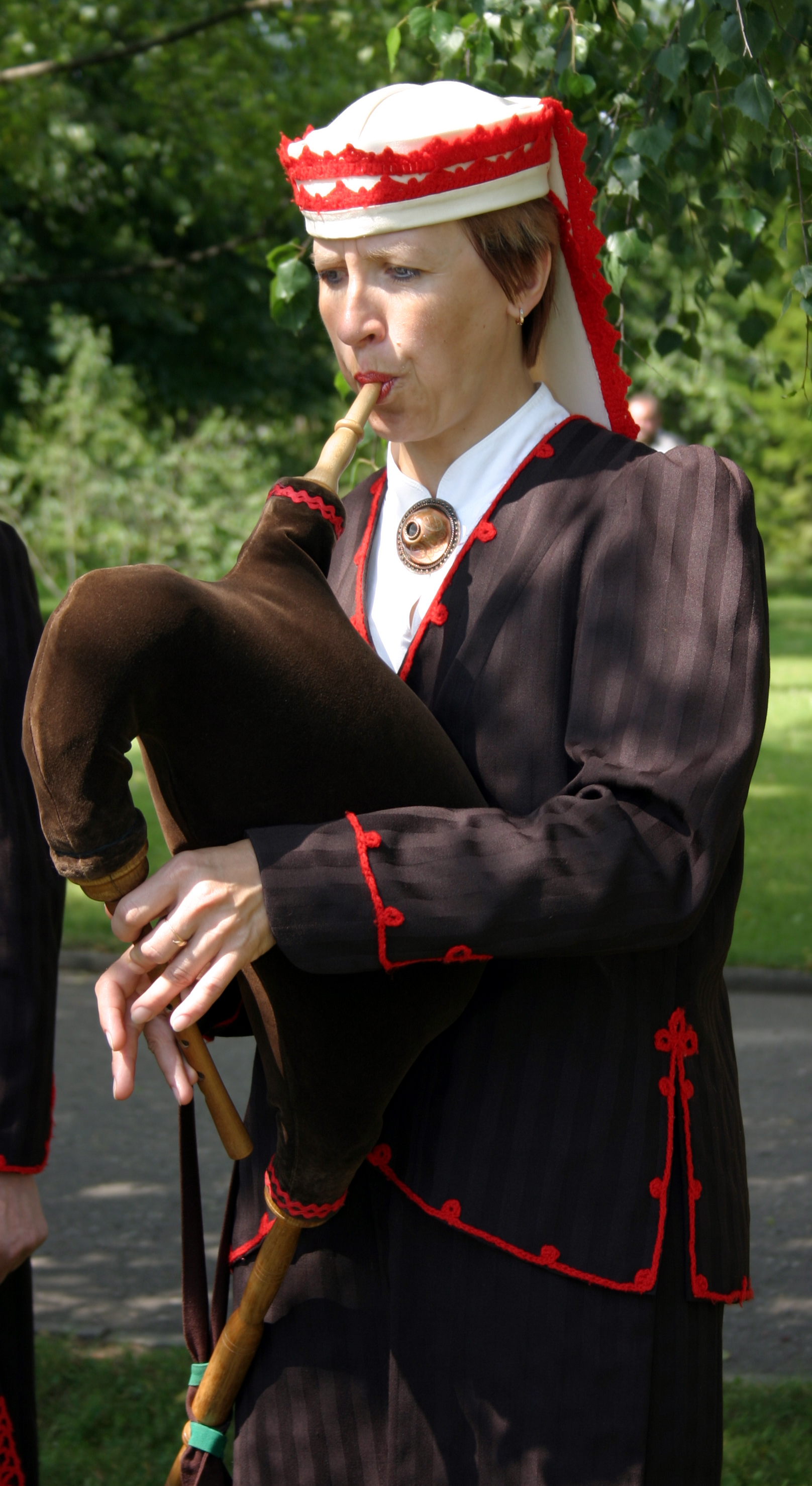
Estonian torupill player

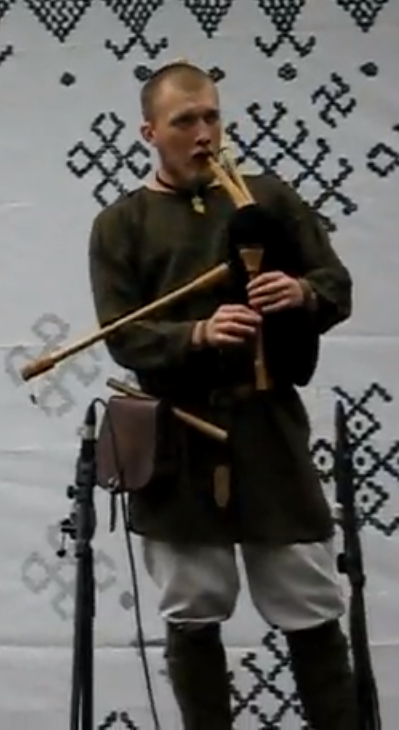
Lithuanian piper

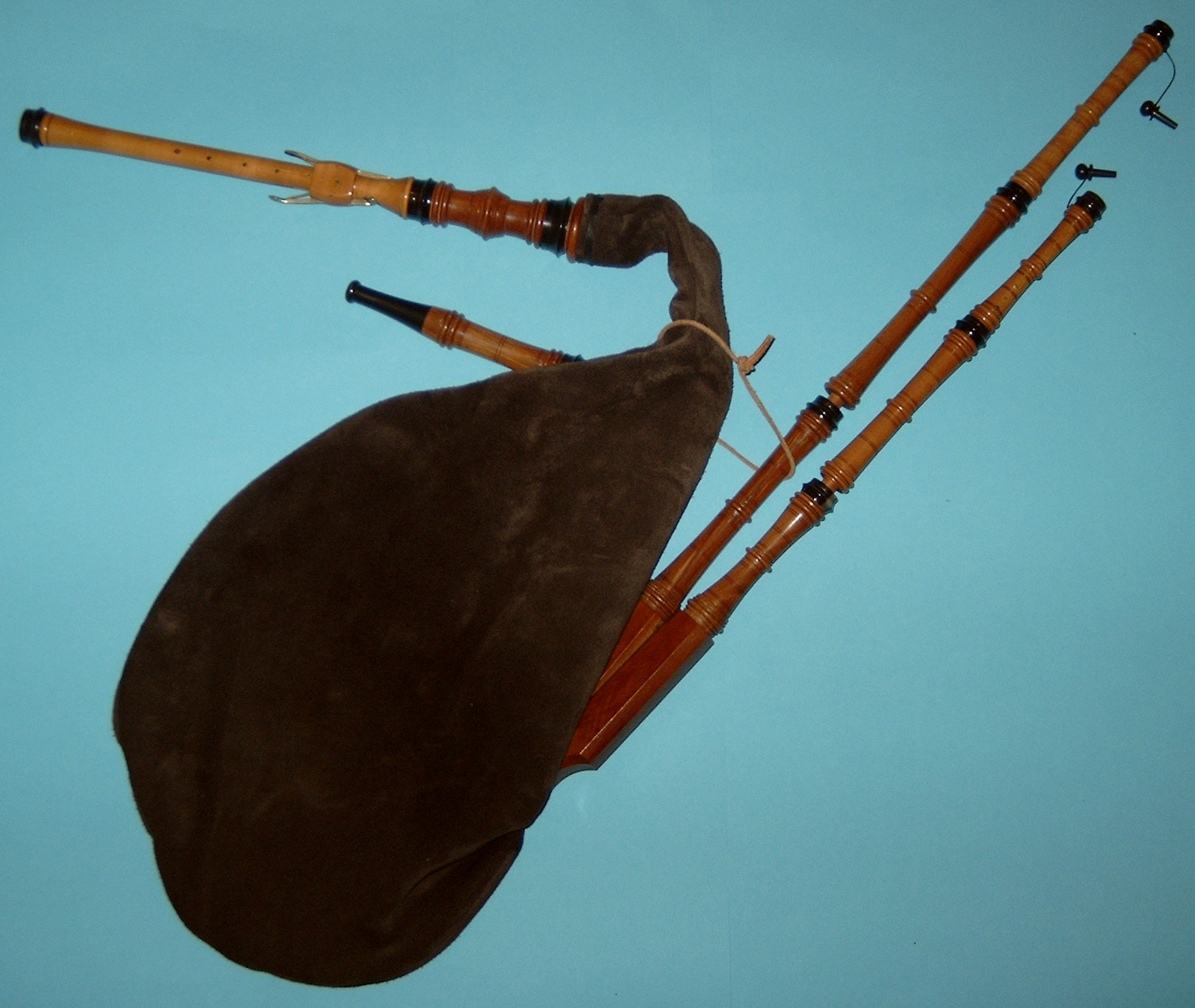
Modern German huemmelchen

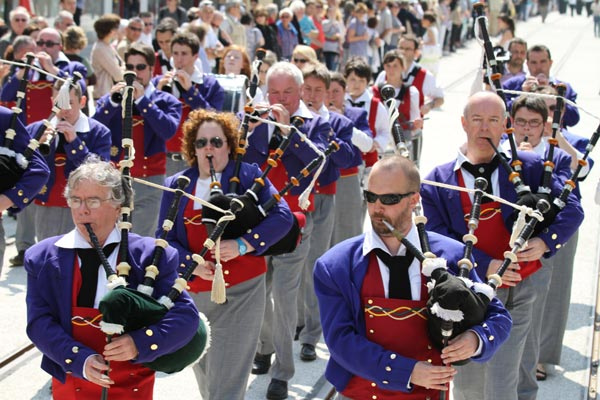
A bagad in Brest, France

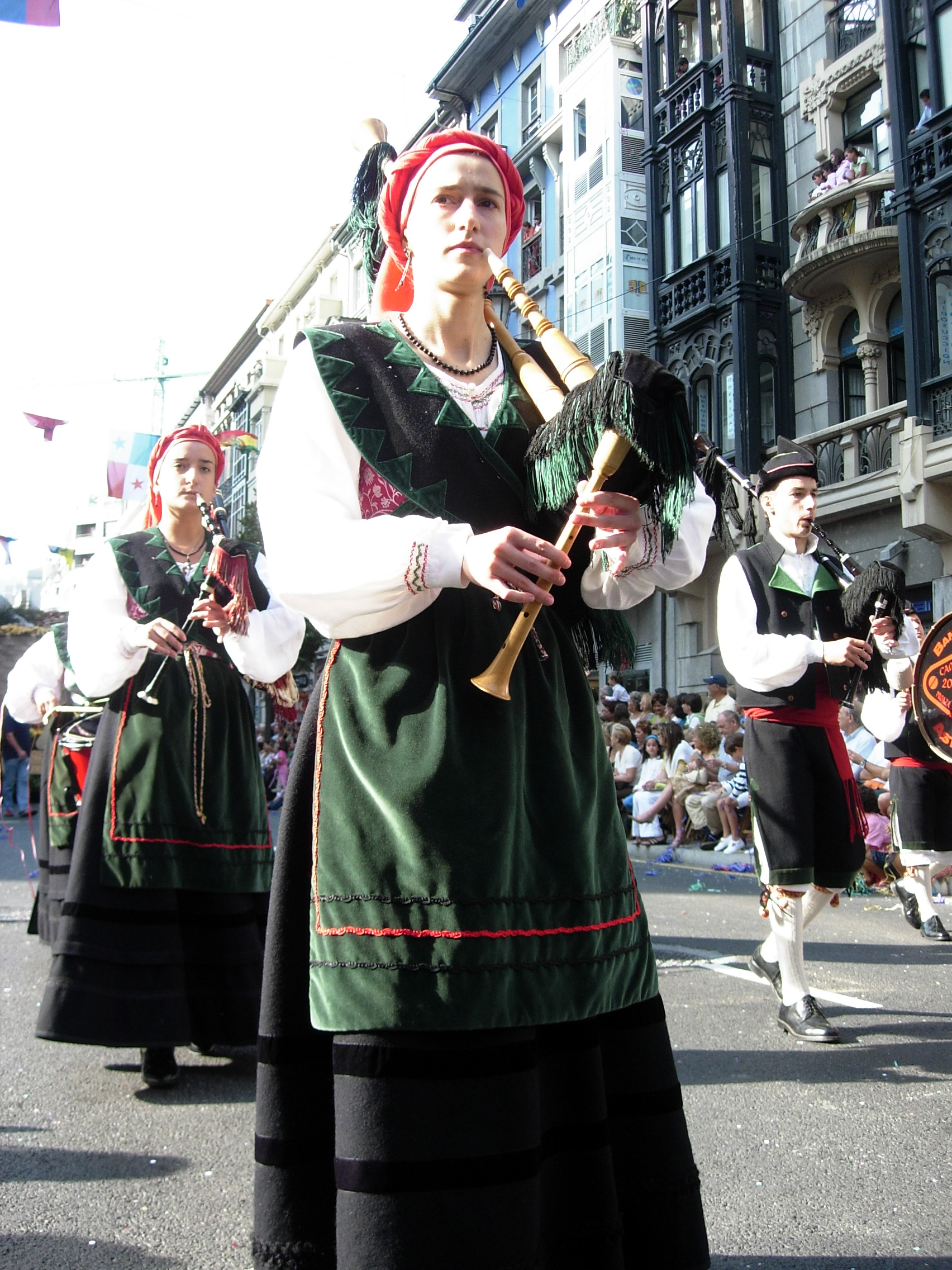
Gaita asturiana

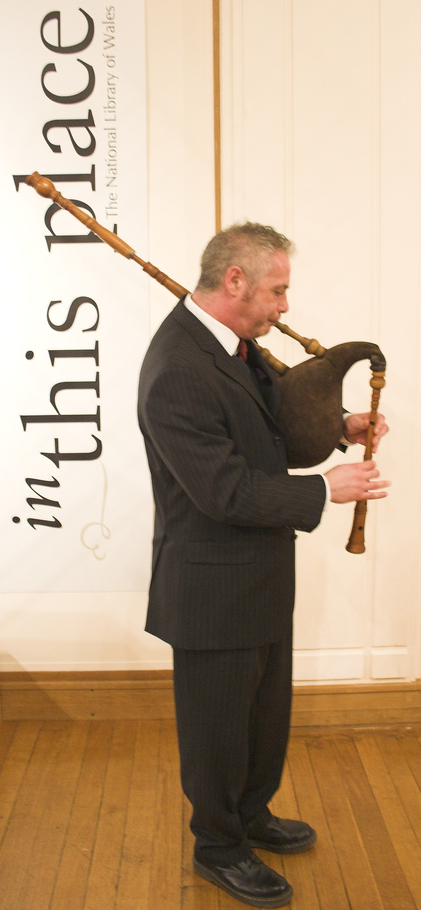
Welsh bagpipes (double-reed type)

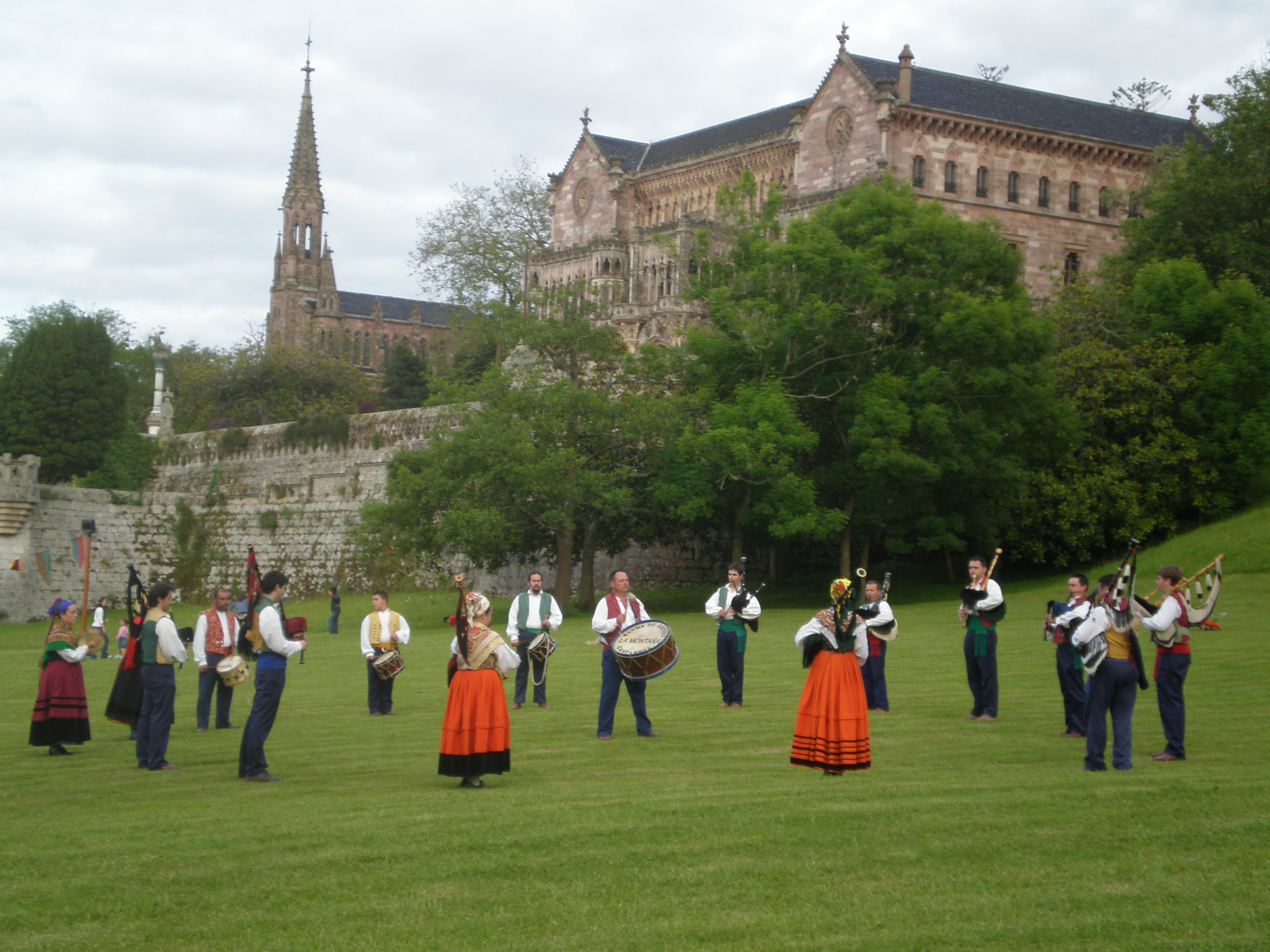
Cantabrian pipe band

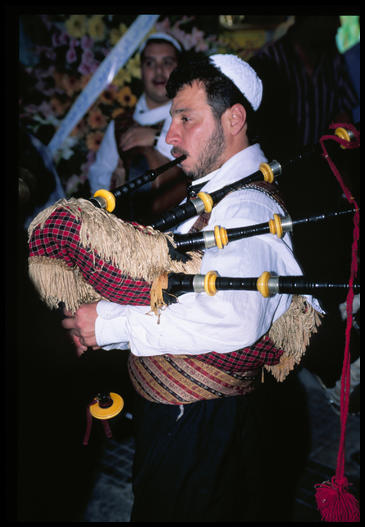
Syrian piper in Damascus, Syria

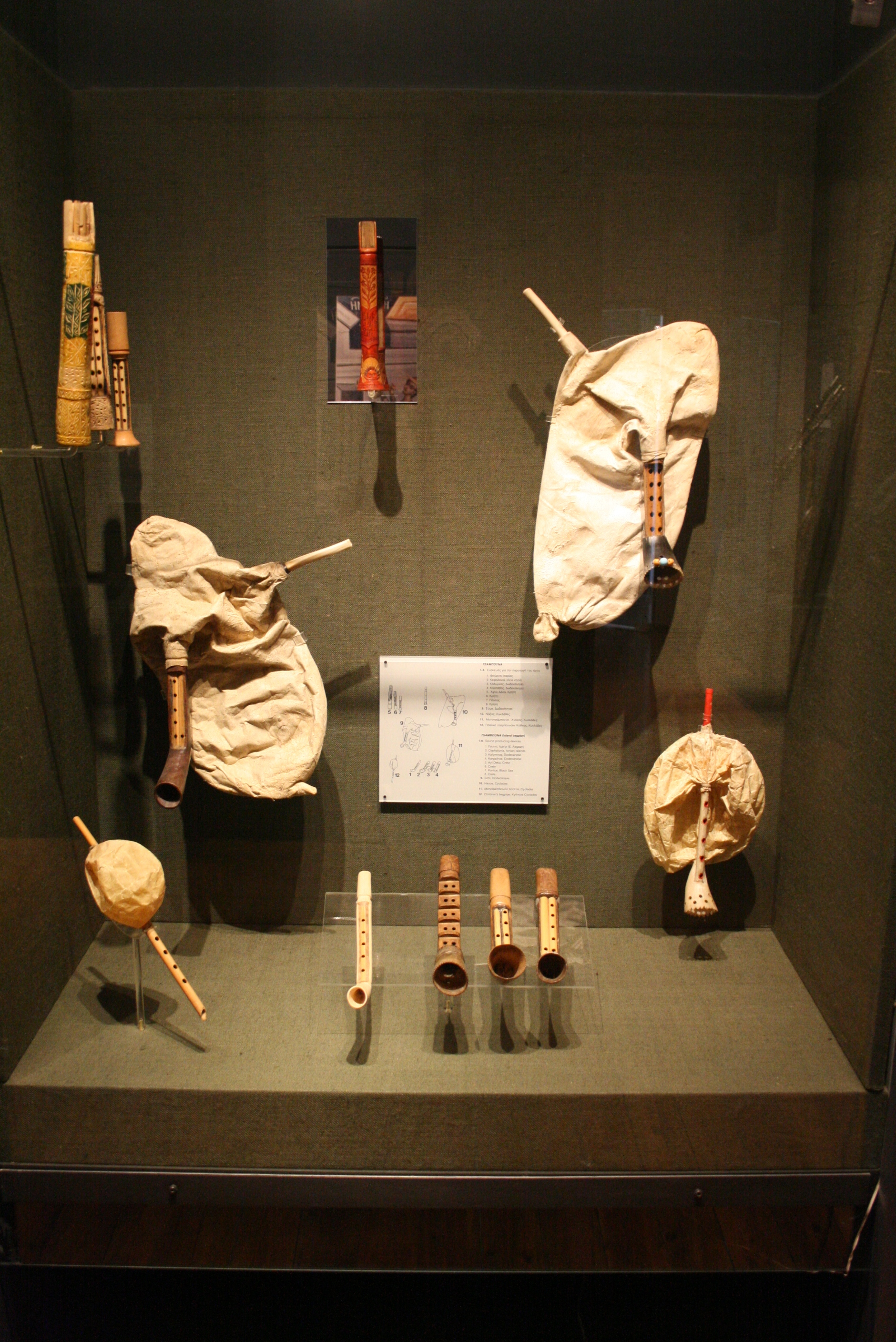
Various forms of the Tsampouna, found in the Greek islands

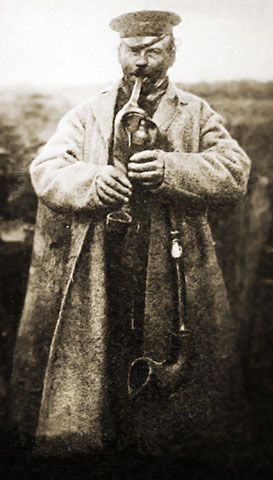
Belarusian piper

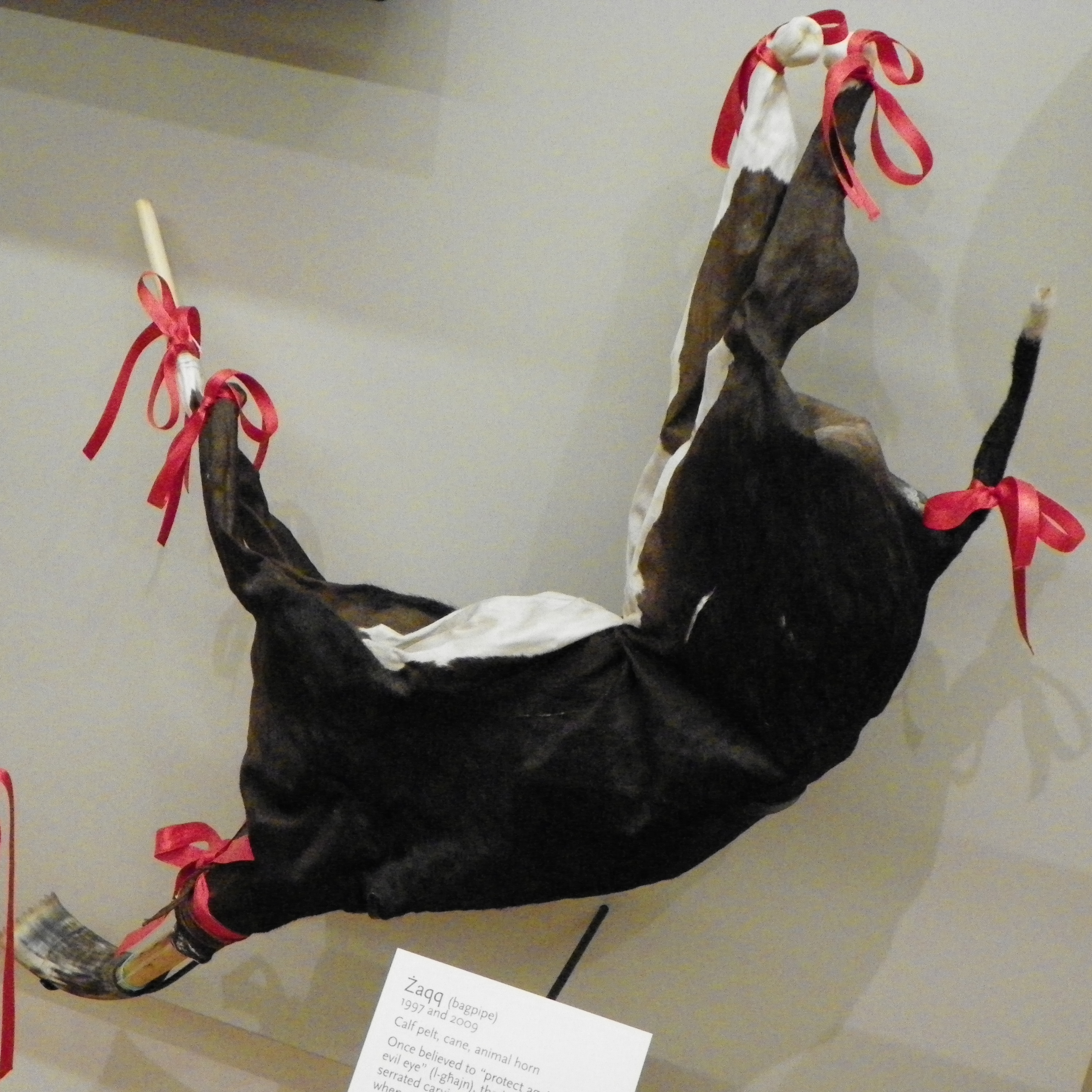
Maltese Żaqq

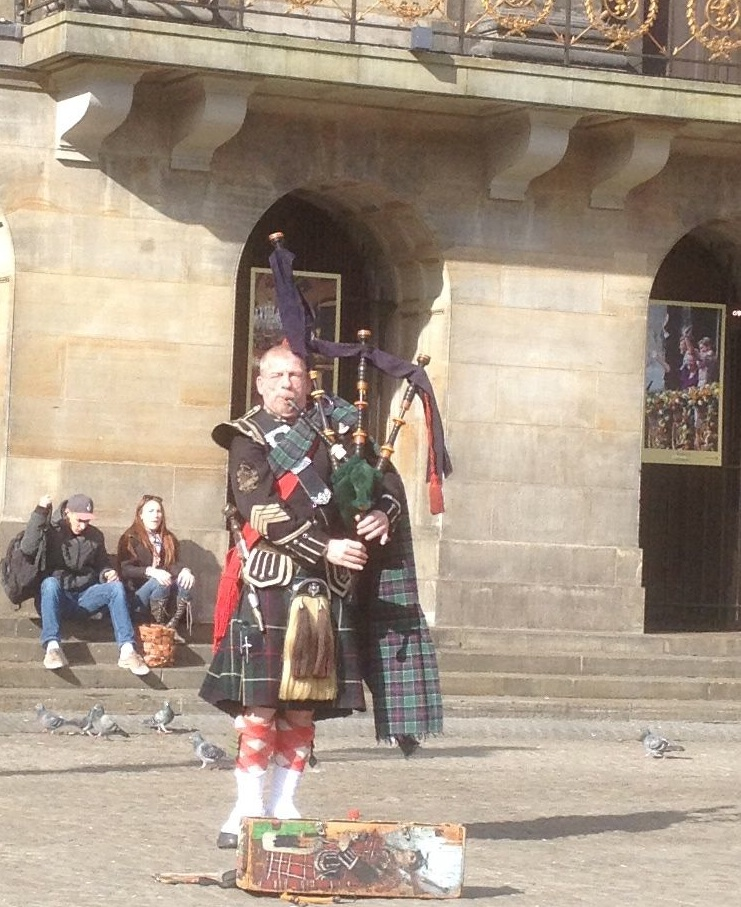
Piper playing by the Royal Palace of Amsterdam

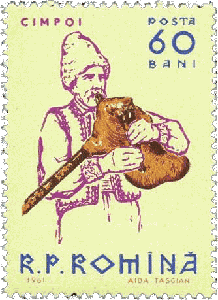
Romanian cimpoi player

Ľubomír Párička playing bagpipes, Slovakia

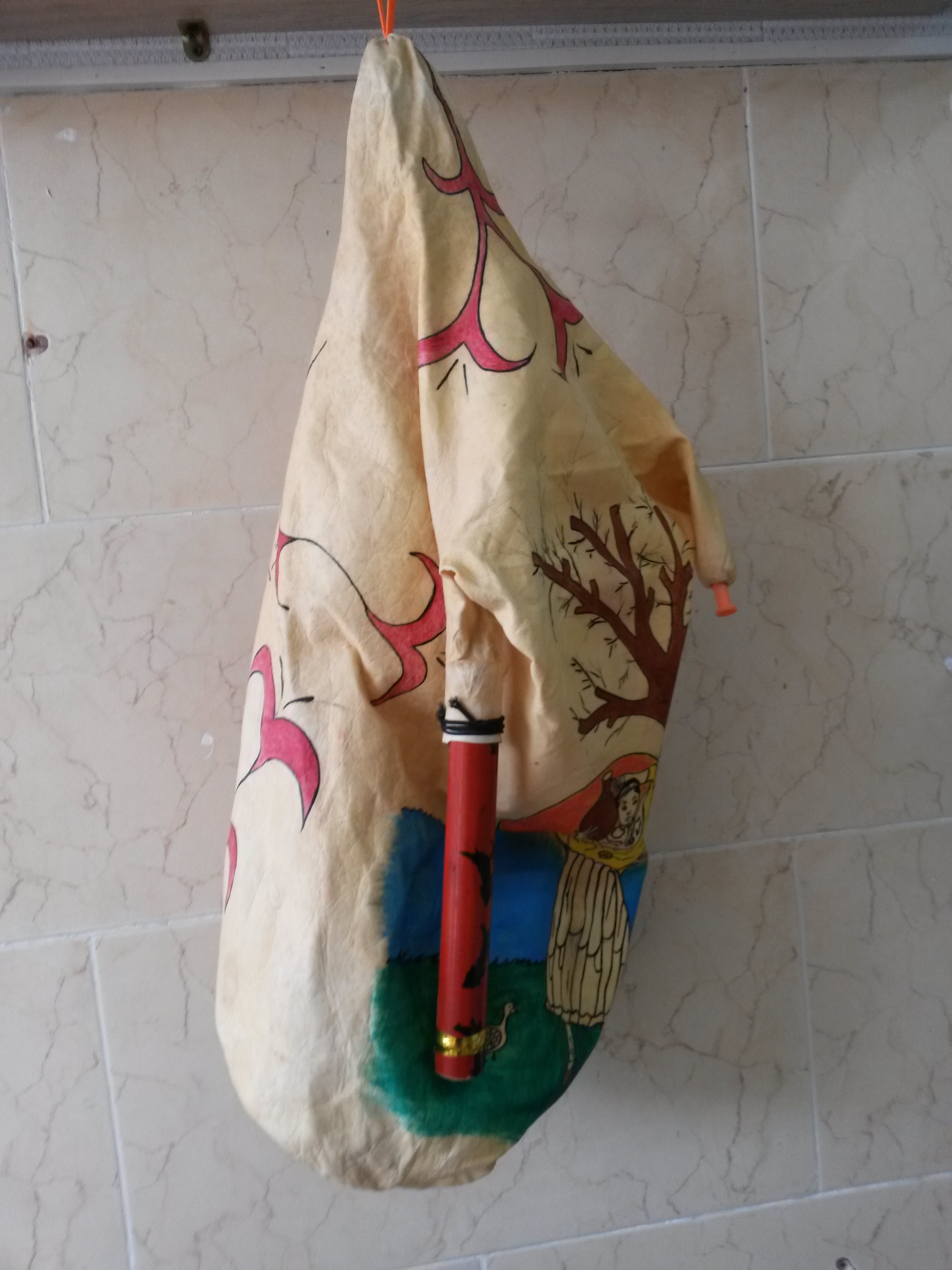
Bagpipes made in Ab Pakhsh, Iran

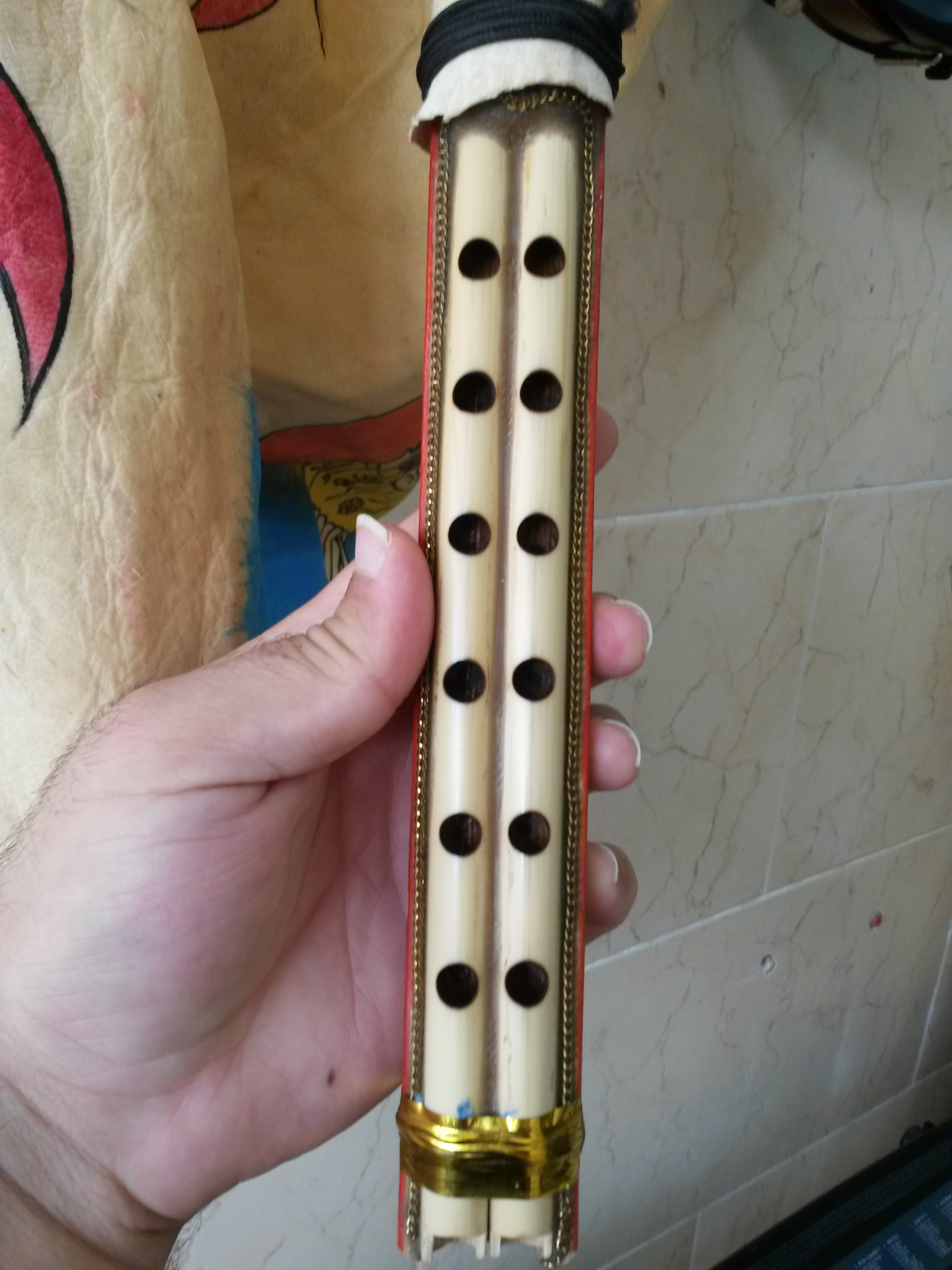
Chanter of bagpipes from Ab Pakhsh

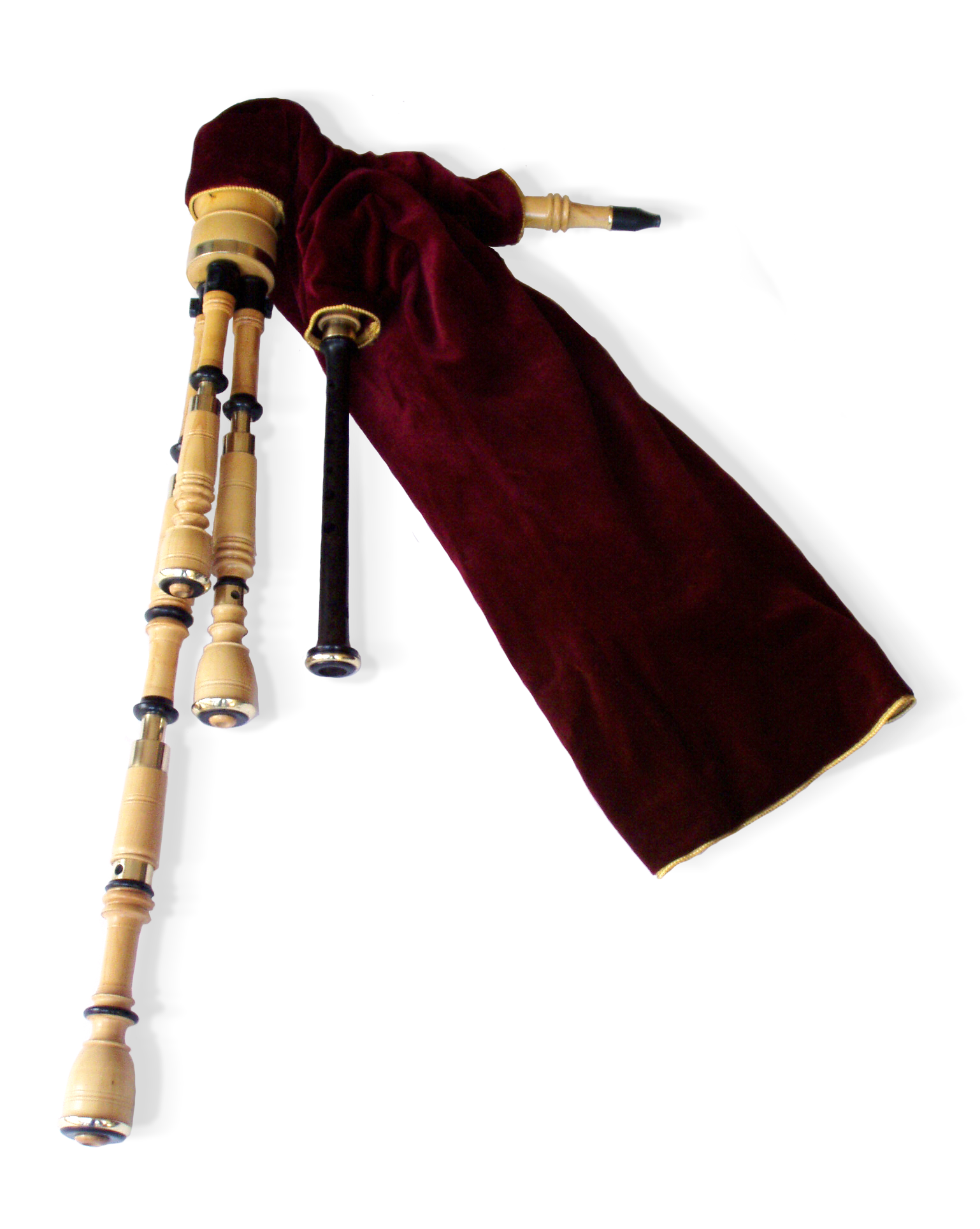
Sac de gemecs, from Catalonia

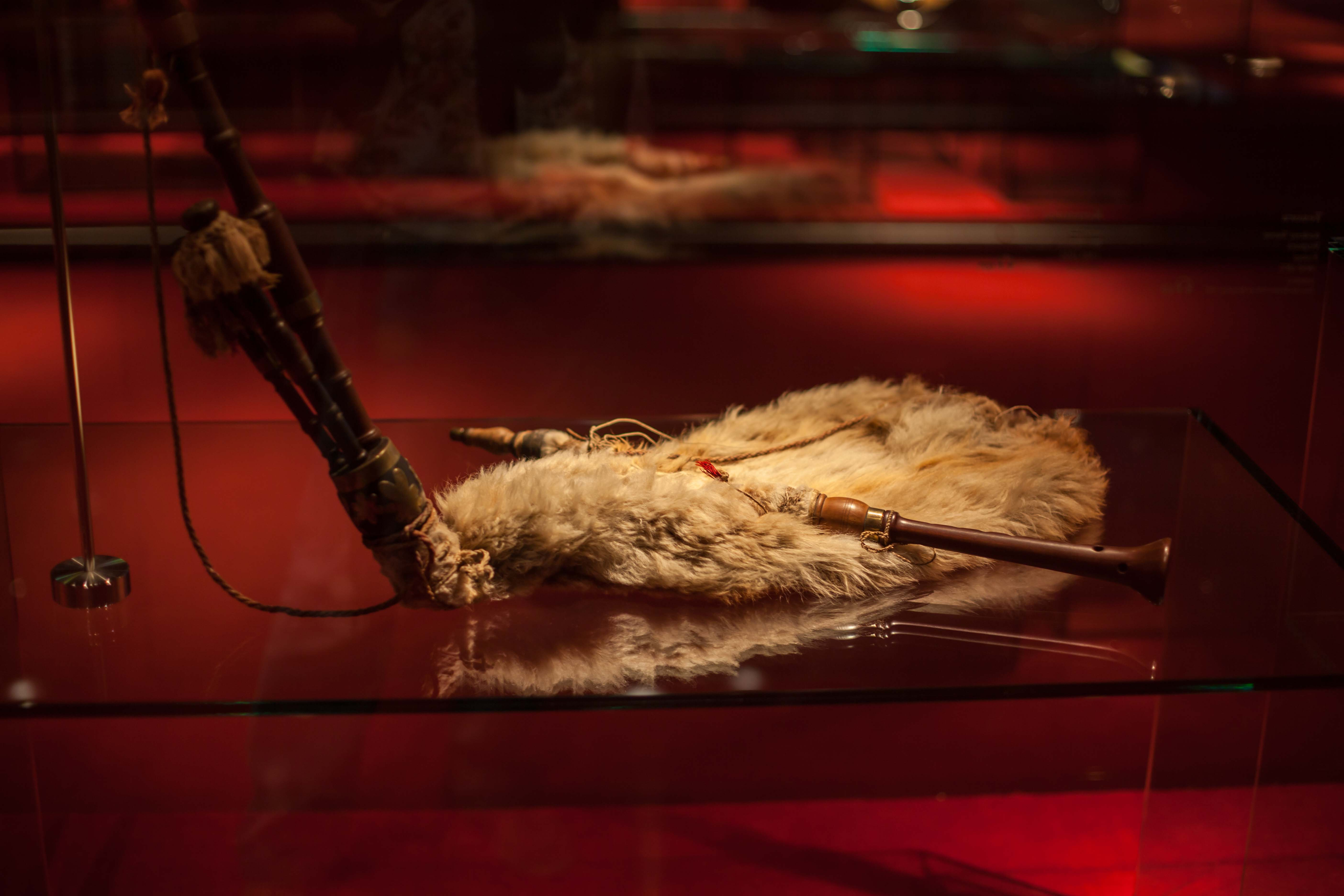
Xeremies, from Mallorca

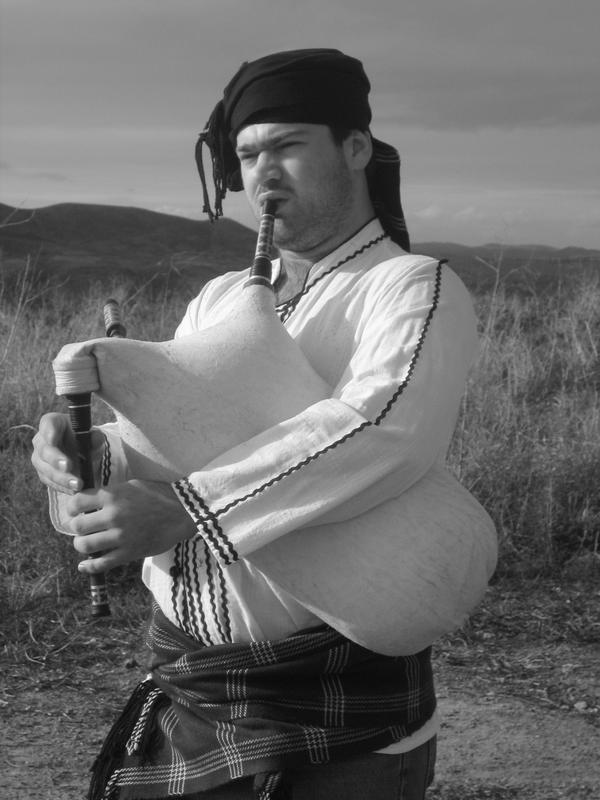
Greek shepherd playing gaida

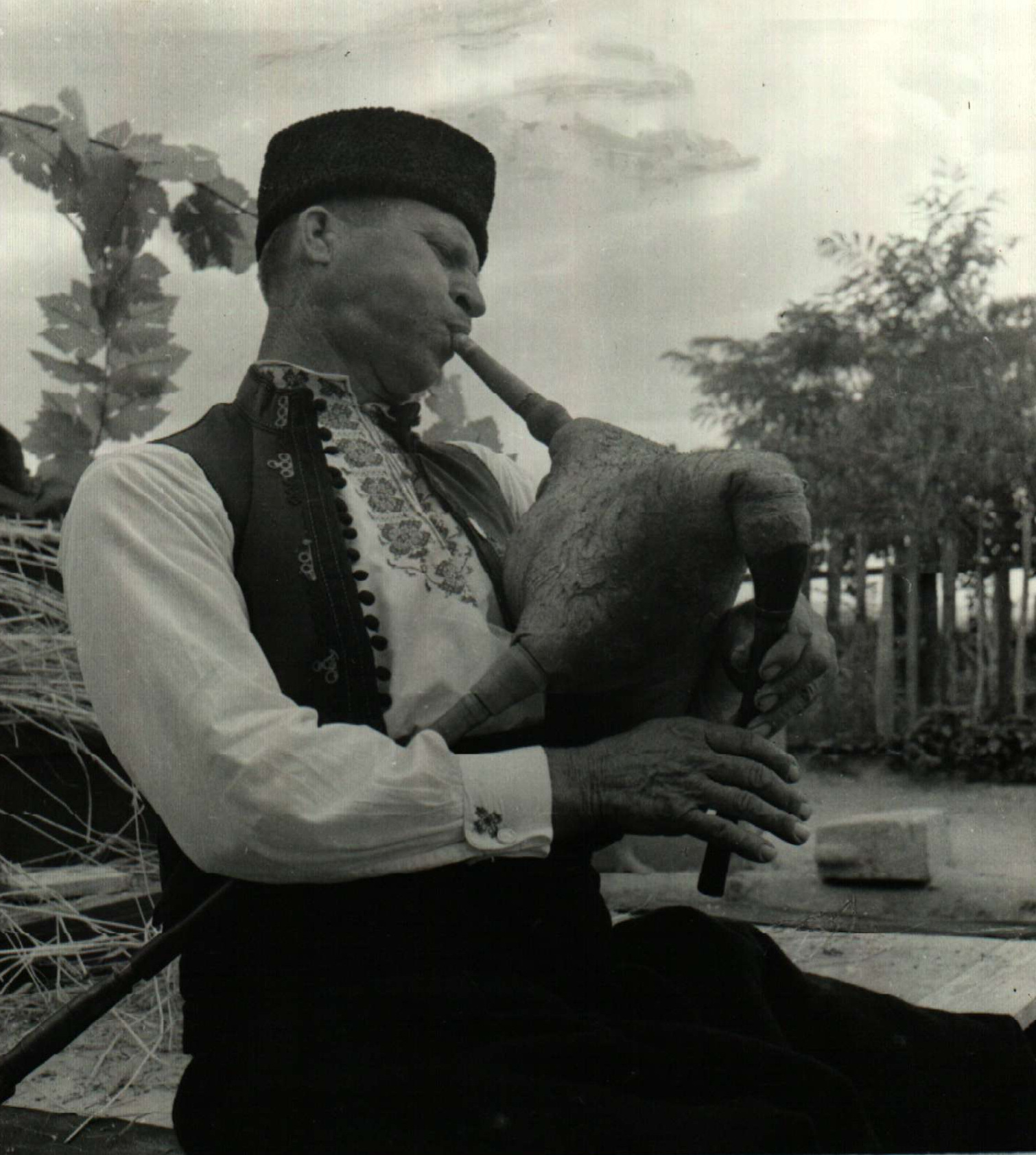
Bulgarian gaida player, terminus ante quem 1945

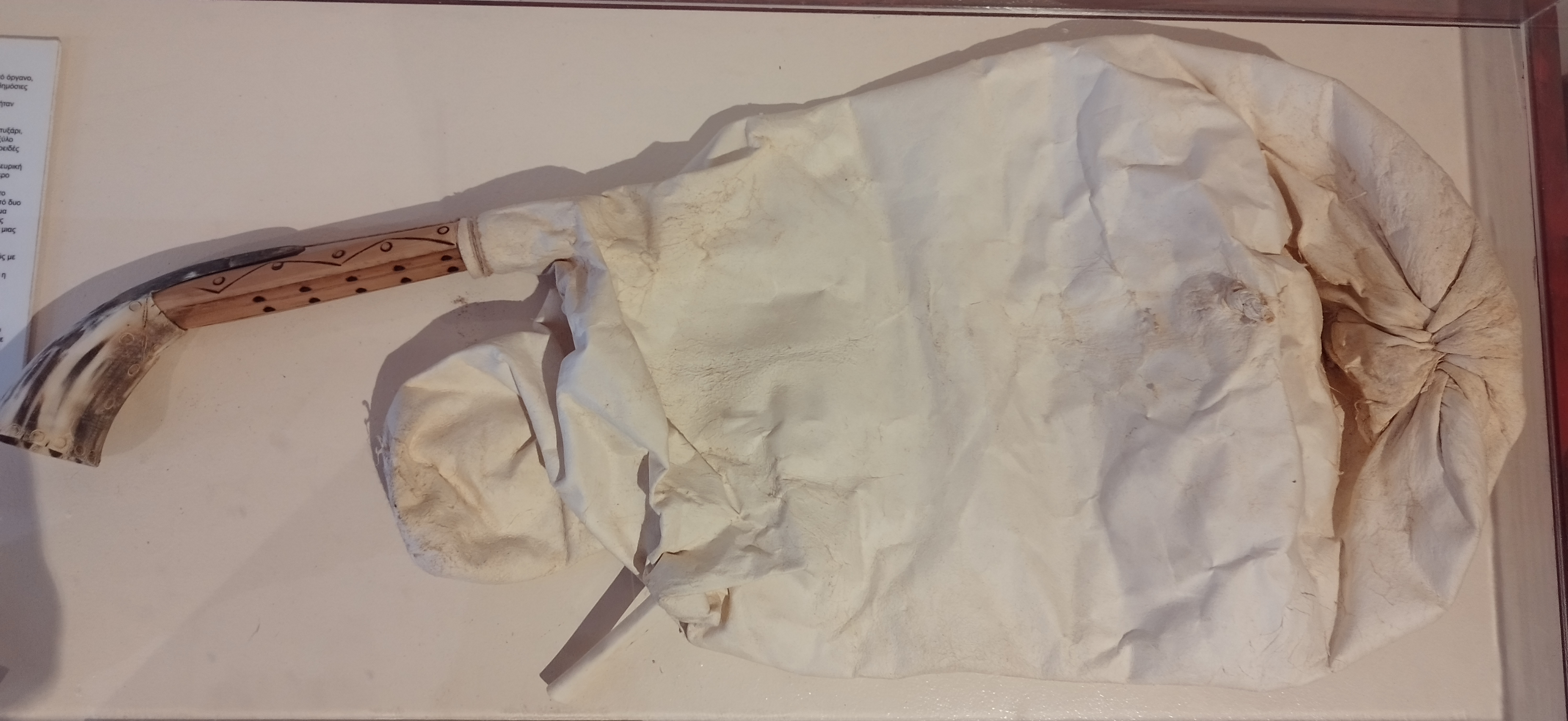
A reconstruction of an "askaulos" in Kotsanas Museum of Ancient Greek Technology, Greece

=== Usage in non-traditional music ===
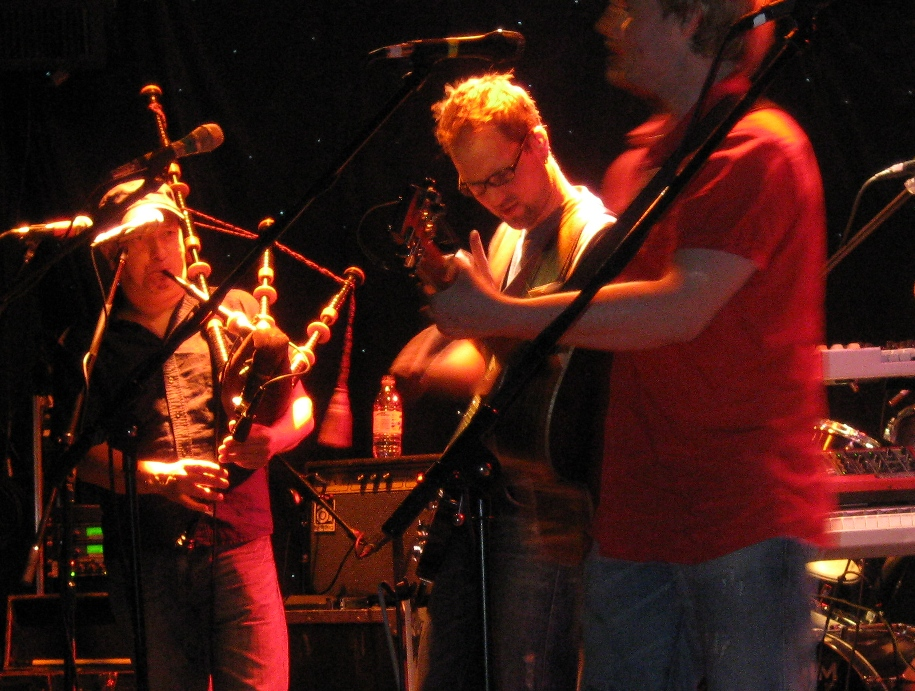
Celtic rock band Enter the Haggis featuring Highland bagpipes

Since the 1960s, bagpipes have also made appearances in other forms of music, including rock, metal, jazz, hip-hop, punk, and classical music, for example with Paul McCartney's "Mull of Kintyre", AC/DC's "It's a Long Way to the Top (If You Wanna Rock 'n' Roll)", and Peter Maxwell Davies's composition An Orkney Wedding, with Sunrise.

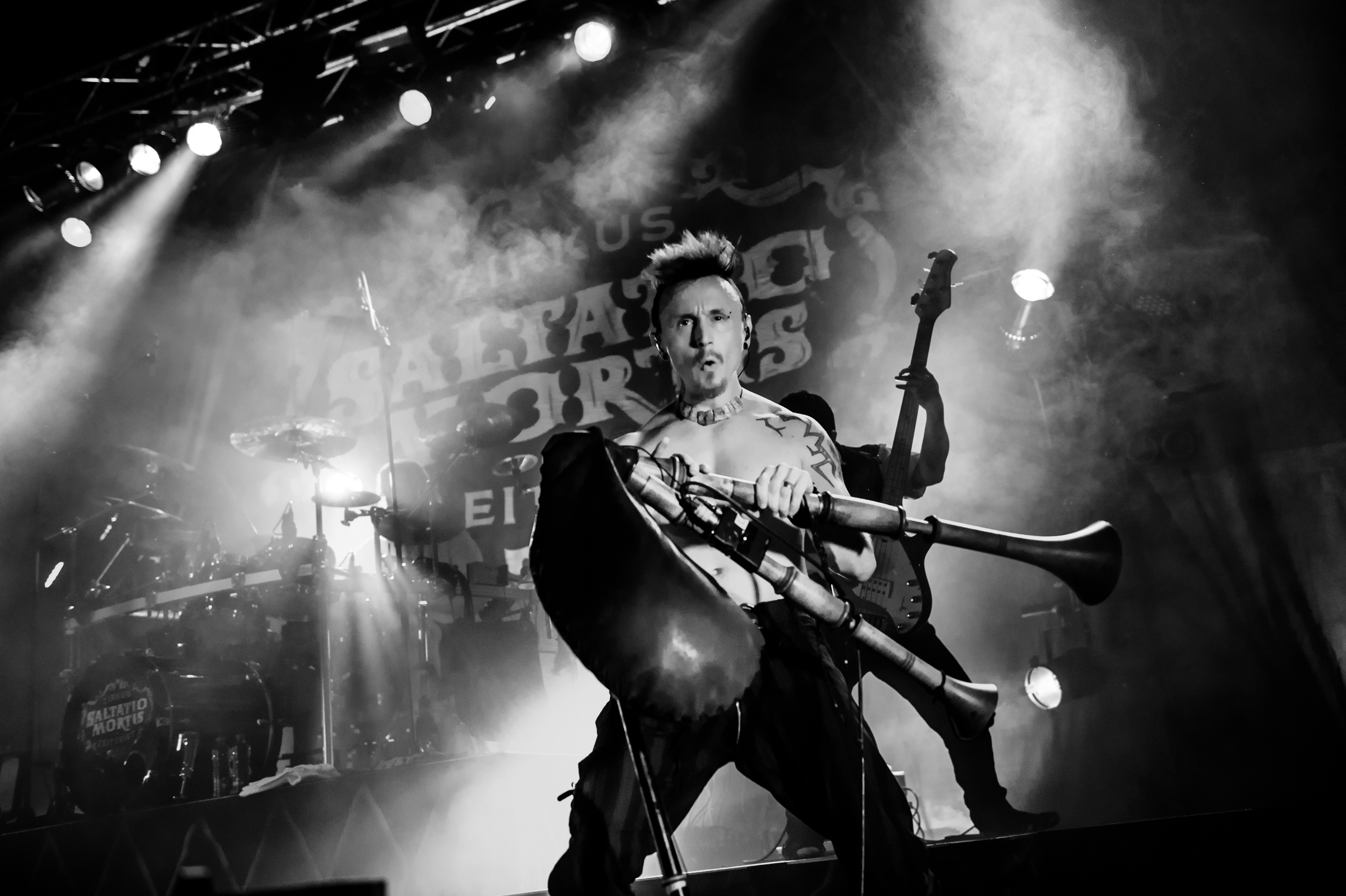
Bagpiper from German band Saltatio Mortis

== Publications ==
=== Periodicals ===
Periodicals covering specific types of bagpipe are addressed in the article for that bagpipe

- An Píobaire, Dublin: Na Píobairí Uilleann.
- Chanter, The Bagpipe Society.
- The Piping Times, Glasgow: The College of Piping.
- Piping Today, Glasgow: The National Piping Centre.
- Utriculus, Italy: Circolo della Zampogna.
- The Voice, Newark, DL: The Eastern United States Pipe Band Association.

=== Books ===
- Baines, Anthony (Nov 1991), Woodwind Instruments and Their History, Dover Pub, ISBN 0-486-26885-3.
- ——— (1995), Bagpipes (3rd ed.), Pitt Rivers Museum, Univ. of Oxford, ISBN 0-902793-10-1, 147 pp. with plates.
- Cheape, Hugh, The Book of the Bagpipe.
- Collinson, Francis (1975), The Bagpipe, The History of a Musical Instrument.
- Vereno, Michael Peter (2021), The Voice of the Wind: A Linguistic History of Bagpipes, International Bagpipe Organisation, ISBN 978-1838369804.

== See also ==
- List of bagpipes
- List of bagpipers
- List of pipe makers
- List of pipe bands
- Glossary of bagpipe terms
- Practice chanter
- Glen (music company)
- Mashak

== Bibliography ==
- Garaj, Bernard (1995). Gajdy a gajdošská tradícia na Slovensku. Bagpipe and Bagpipers´ Tradition in Slovakia. ASCO Ústav hudobnej vedy SAV Bratislava.
- Dzimrevski, Borivoje (1996). Gajdata vo Makedonija: Instrument-instrumentalist-muzika. Institut za folklor Marko Cepenkov. ISBN 978-9989642098.
- Lommel, Arle. "The Hungarian Duda and Contra-Chanter Bagpipes of the Carpathian Basin." The Galpin Society Journal (2008): 305–321.
- Rice, Timothy (1994). May It Fill Your Soul: Experiencing Bulgarian Music. University of Chicago Press. ISBN 978-0226711225.
- Atanasov, Vergilij (2002). The Bulgarian GAIDA/BAGPIPE. Massachusetts: Gaida Studies. ISBN 0-9724898-0-0.
- Širola, Božidar (1937). Sviraljke s udarnim jezičkom. Zagreb: JAZU.
- Leibman, Robert. Traditional Songs and Dances from the Soko Banja Area. LP: Selo Records.
- Levy, Mark (1985). The Bagpipe in the Rhodope Mountains of Bulgaria. University of California.
- Jakovljević, Rastko (2012). Marginality and Cultural Identities: Locating the Bagpipe Music of Serbia (Thesis). PhD Thesis, Durham University.
