= Cimpoi =

Romanian bagpipe

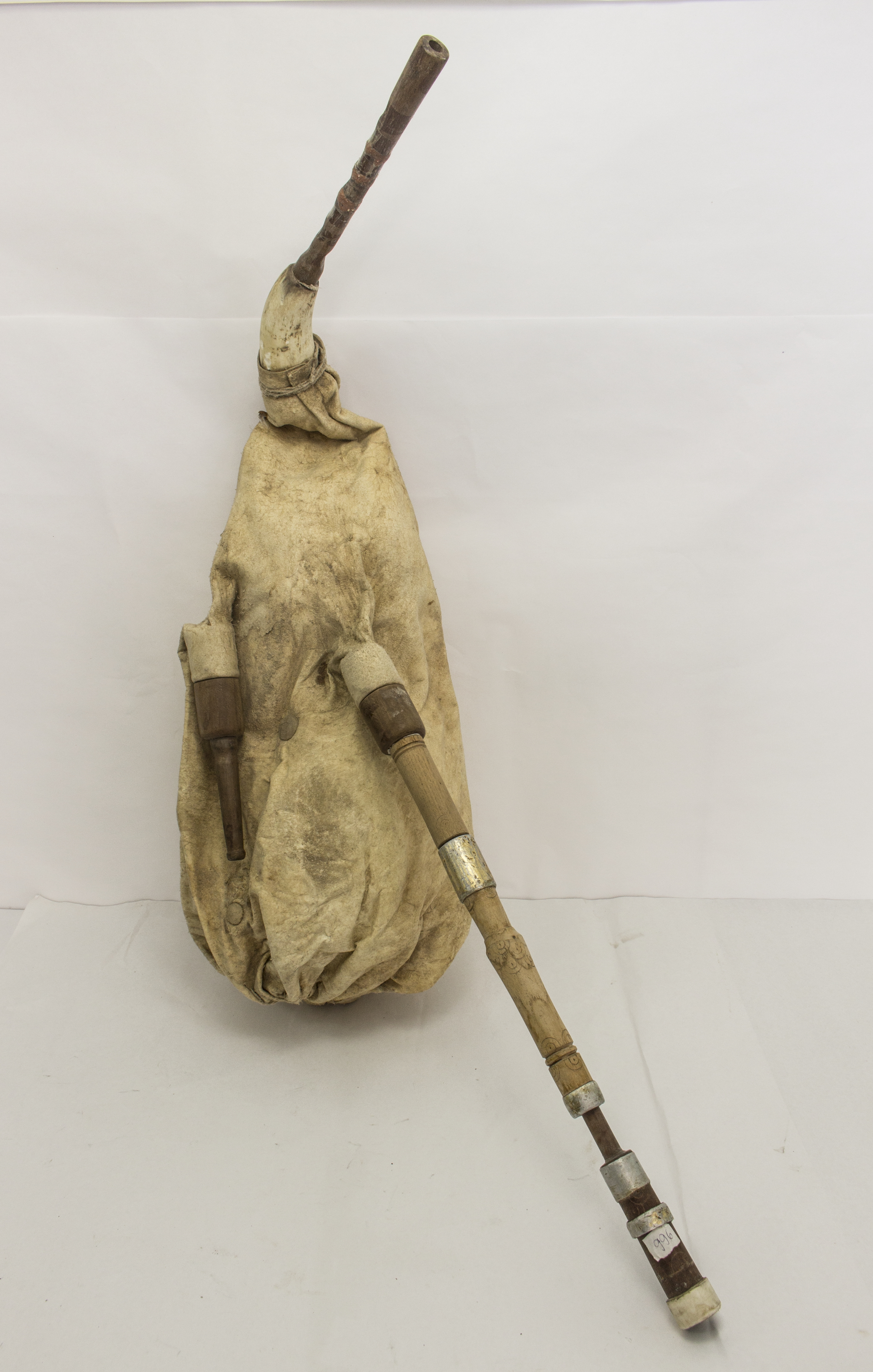
- Cimpoi (Tulcea, second half of the 20th century)
- Other names: șimpoi, cimponi, șimponi, ciumpoi, cempoi, carabă, cărabă, gaidă, cimpoaie, cărăbi
- Classification: Aerophone
- Hornbostel–Sachs classification: 422.22-62 (Sets of single-reed instruments with a flexible air reservoir.)

Related instruments
- Bagpipes (family), duda, kozioł, tsampouna, zampogna

The cimpoi (Romanian: cimpoi, pronounced [t͡ʃimˈpoj]; also șimpoi, cimponi, șimponi, ciumpoi, cempoi, carabă, cărabă, gaidă, cimpoaie, cărăbi ) is a Romanian folk woodwind musical instrument and a regional variety of the bagpipe. It is an aerophone consisting of an air reservoir (bag) and several pipes: a blowpipe, a drone, and a melody pipe (chanter).

The cimpoi is considered an instrument of local origin, traditionally associated with the territories of present-day Romania and the Republic of Moldova. The first written references to the instrument date from the 16th century. In the past, it was widespread throughout most regions and, alongside the fluier, served as one of the principal instruments of shepherds and an important element of rural festivities. By the early 21st century, the tradition of playing the cimpoi has survived mainly in certain regions (Oltenia, Dobruja, Hunedoara, and Moldavia), although the instrument continues to be used in folk ensembles.

From an organological perspective, the Romanian cimpoi belongs to the Eastern European group of bagpipes with a cylindrical bore and single reeds. The instrument displays considerable typological diversity. Researchers distinguish six main types, differing primarily in the construction of the chanter, which may be single or double, as well as in the number and arrangement of finger holes. Instruments with a double chanter make it possible to produce not only a melody and drone but also a simple harmonic interval (usually a fifth), which researchers consider one of the oldest forms of Romanian polyphony.

In traditional culture, the cimpoi occupies a dual symbolic position. On the one hand, it is regarded as a pastoral instrument closely associated with shepherd life; on the other, it is depicted in folklore and legends as possessing demonic or supernatural attributes and is sometimes associated with evil spirits. Certain forms of performance are specific to the instrument, such as the Dance of the puppets, in which the musician plays the bagpipe while simultaneously manipulating marionettes. The influence of the cimpoi can also be observed in other genres of Romanian folk music, where instruments such as the violin or fluier imitate its characteristic drone and melodic patterns.

== History and distribution ==
References to instruments resembling the bagpipe appear in ancient literature, including works by Aristophanes, Suetonius, Martial, and Dio Chrysostom, although no instruments or visual depictions from this period have survived. Reliable historical evidence for the bagpipe in Western Europe dates from the early Middle Ages. One of the earliest written references is the term musa – the root of the French: muse, meaning “bagpipe” – which appears in a 9th-century treatise by Regino of Prüm, where it is listed among other wind instruments between tibiae and fistula.

From the 13th century onward, the evidence becomes more detailed. A separate drone pipe is mentioned in Adam de la Halle’s Jeu de Robin et Marion (c. 1283), and a drone pipe from this period was discovered at Weoley Castle in England. From this time, depictions of bagpipes in European art become increasingly common. By around 1500, French literary sources recorded numerous names for the instrument, including muse, musette, cornemuse, and sacomuse.

=== Regional distribution ===
The cimpoi belongs to a broad family of bagpipes distributed across Europe, North Africa, and parts of Asia. Romania and Moldova are located at the intersection of several Eastern and Southeastern European cultural zones, which helps explain the diversity of local bagpipe forms. Closely related instruments are used by neighboring peoples and can be grouped into several typological categories:

- Central European type (duda, kozioł): characteristic of West Slavic regions (the Czech Republic, Slovakia, Poland) and Ukraine. This group includes Czech and Slovak dudy, typically with one chanter and one drone ending in horn bells, as well as the Polish kozioł, a large bellows-blown bagpipe with a bass drone, used in ensembles with mazanki (small violins) until the late 19th century.
- Hungarian type (duda): featuring a double chanter with two parallel channels – one for the melody and the other (contra) providing a variable drone used for rhythmic accompaniment. Transylvanian varieties of the cimpoi equipped with double chanters are structurally related to this type.
- Balkan type (gaida): a mouth-blown bagpipe widespread from Albania (gajdë) and Greece (tsampouna) through Serbia and North Macedonia to Bulgaria (gaida). This type usually has a single chanter, often with a curved bell, and a separate drone. Romanian cimpoi with a single chanter, especially those from southern regions, are typologically closest to this group.

=== Historical evidence in Romania ===
The Grove Dictionary of Music and Musicians classifies the Romanian cimpoi as an instrument of local origin. The earliest specific written references in Romanian lands date from the 16th and 17th centuries. A 16th-century translation of the Acts of the Apostles produced in Maramureș contains the phrase „Romanian: întru glasurele ciînpoiloru” (“to the sounds of the cimpoi”). The Codex Sturdzanus, transcribed in Transylvania between 1580 and 1619, includes a Bogomil text warning: „Romanian: O, amar cela ce be și mănăîncă cu cimpoi și cu ceteri și cu alăute!” (“Woe to him who drinks and eats to the cimpoi, zithers, and lutes!”). Chroniclers such as Grigore Ureche and Miron Costin mention bagpipers at the courts of Moldavian princes (gospodari). Ureche describes Prince Aaron (1591–1595) as being particularly fond of dances and bagpipers, whom he maintained for entertainment. Costin recounts a feast at which a bagpiper performed on an instrument wrapped in expensive silk. The Italian monk Niccolò Barsi, who visited the Principality of Moldavia in 1640, noted that dances began to the sounds of violins, bagpipes, flutes, and drums (Italian: violini, sordelline, piffari, tamburi, collascioni con tre corde). These sources indicate that during the Middle Ages the bagpipe was known not only in rural settings but also at princely courts. Over time, at court and among the nobility, the cimpoi was replaced by instruments introduced from Constantinople under Ottoman influence, while it continued to survive in folk tradition.

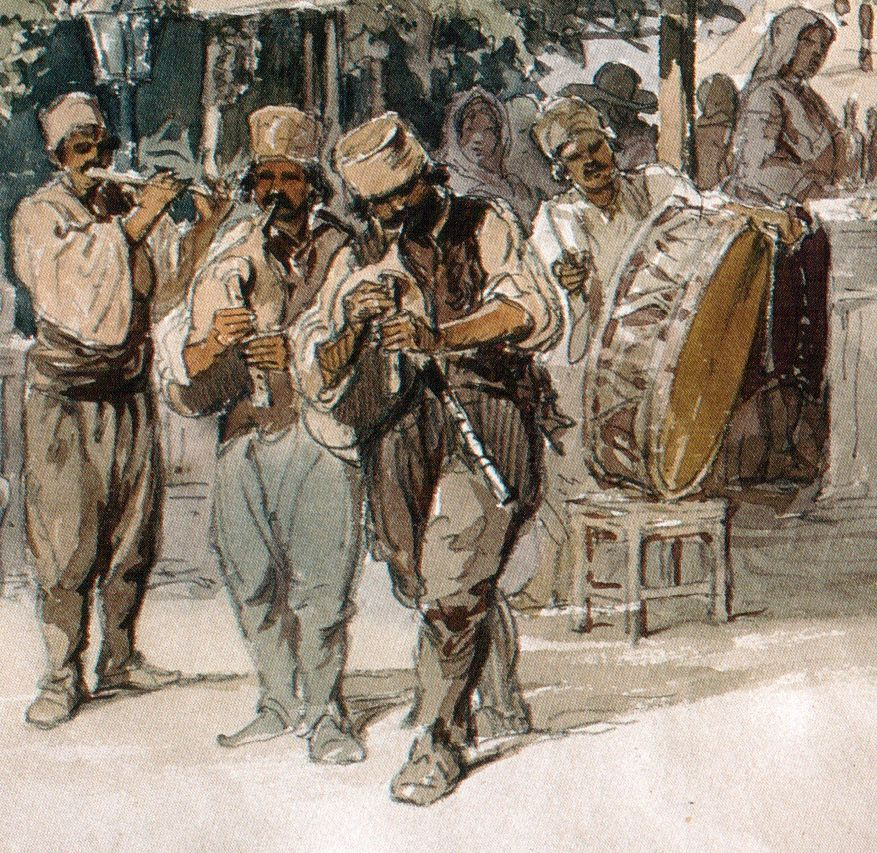
Musicians at the Târgul Moşilor fair, Bucharest (detail), Amedeo Preziosi, watercolor, 1869

Visual representations of the cimpoi in Romanian art are rare and occur mainly in church murals. This has been attributed to the strict canons of the Eastern Church regarding the depiction of musical instruments in biblical scenes and to the fact that, by the time many murals were created, the violin had largely replaced the cimpoi and had become associated in iconography with demonic figures. In popular belief, the cimpoi itself was sometimes regarded as a “devil’s instrument,” which limited its depiction to scenes of hell. Nevertheless, foreign artists documented its use: Auguste Raffet produced a drawing of a bagpiper in 1837, and Amedeo Preziosi depicted a fair in the late 1860s featuring an ensemble of four musicians, including two bagpipers.

=== Geography of distribution in Romania and Moldova ===
Historical and ethnographic evidence suggests that the cimpoi was once used throughout most regions of Romania and Moldova. Even in areas where the instrument itself disappeared, its influence remains evident in folk instrumental music, particularly in violin performance, which often imitates bagpipe drone effects and melodic formulas. Over time, however, the geographical range of the cimpoi narrowed. In the second half of the 20th century, it survived mainly in northern Oltenia, parts of Muntenia, Dobruja, Moldavia, Bukovina, the southern regions of the Republic of Moldova, as well as southwestern Transylvania and parts of the Banat.

The former popularity of the instrument is reflected in surnames derived from its name or from the profession of bagpiper, such as Cimpoi, Cimpoieșu, Cimpoieru, Cimpoiaș, and Cărăbaș (from carabă, the name of the chanter).

== Names and etymology ==
The primary Romanian name for the bagpipe is cimpoi; performers are referred to as cimpoier, cimpoiaș, or cimpoieș. The term cimpoi, like the Greek tsampouna and the Italian zampogna, is commonly traced to Ancient Greek: συμφωνία (symphonía), meaning “consonance” or “symphony”. In antiquity, symphonia was one of the names used for the Greek bagpipe (askaulos). This etymology has been interpreted by scholars as suggesting a long historical continuity of the instrument, although written documentation appears only from the late Middle Ages.

Regional pronunciation variants include șimpoi (Banat), cimponi or șimponi (Hunedoara), ciumpoi (Tulcea), and cempoi (Gura Humorului, Bukovina). Other names include carabă or cărabă (derived from the chanter, in southern Banat) and gaidă, used among Aromanians. In some contexts, the instrument is referred to in the plural as cimpoaie or cărăbi.

== Study ==
The first systematic description of Romanian folk instruments, including the cimpoi, was published in 1877 by the folklorist and ethnographer Teodor Burada. In his work Research on the Dances and Musical Instruments of the Romanians, he described the cimpoi as an ancient instrument and one of the most popular among peasants, who performed traditional dances to its sound.

In 1912–1913, the Hungarian composer and folklorist Béla Bartók documented a cimpoi with two chanters among Romanian communities in Bihor and Maramureș and recorded a number of melodies for the instrument. He noted a programmatic piece imitating the call of a quail and observed that many dance melodies played on the fluier and violin imitate the style and techniques of cimpoi performance.

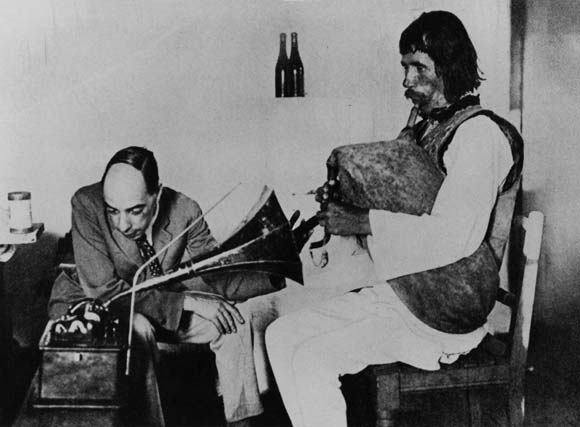
Constantin Brăiloiu recording a cimpoi player (photo by Iosif Berman, 1934)

A major contribution to the study of the instrument was made by the Romanian ethnomusicologist Constantin Brăiloiu. In 1931, he documented the practice of playing the cimpoi while performing the Dance of the puppets (Jocul păpușilor), and he used this material to illustrate his methodological work Outline of a Method for Musical Folklore. Brăiloiu also made numerous field recordings of cimpoi music, preserving the performances of musicians such as Gheorghe Mușuleac (Bukovina) and Pătruț Munteanu-Kovacs (Hunedoara).

In the second half of the 20th century, research on the cimpoi developed on an organological basis. Tiberiu Alexandru’s monograph Musical Instruments of the Romanian People (1956) proposed a classification of cimpoi types based on chanter construction, identifying five main categories. In the 1970s, the Romanian-German researcher Gottfried Habenicht expanded this typology by adding a sixth type and providing detailed descriptions of manufacturing techniques. Iosif Herțea focused on the symbolic and ritual aspects of the instrument, including the tradition of playing with puppets. In the 21st century, comprehensive studies combining ethnographic and organological data have been published, including Traian Ciuculescu's The Cimpoi among the Romanians (2014) and the second volume of Ovidiu Papană's series Romanian Folk Instruments: Musical-Acoustic Research (2019).

== Structure and types of the cimpoi ==
=== Structure ===
The cimpoi consists of four main components: an air bag, a blowpipe, a melody pipe (chanter), and a drone pipe:

- Air bag (Romanian: burduf; less commonly foale): made from animal skin, usually goat. The size varies by region, with the largest examples found in Hunedoara (up to approximately 60 × 38 cm) and the smallest in Dobruja (about 35 × 20 cm).
- Blowpipe (suflător): (Note: Regional names: suflător (Ploiești), suflătoare (Moldavia and Hunedoara), sufleci (Craiova, Bucharest, and northern Dobruja), sufleţi (Bucharest), sufleare (the Hunedoara region), sufloi (Hunedoara, northern Dobruja), sufloni (Banat), suflaci (Craiova, Ploiești), clupă (northern Dobruja), comprimator (Ploiești), muștiuc (Buzău, northern Dobruja), and ţavă (Bucharest, Galați).) used to inflate the bag and fitted with a leather valve (clapă, plotog) to prevent air loss. It is typically made of elder wood, metal, or bone.
- Drone pipe (bâzoi): (Note: Regional names: bâzoi (Oltenia, northern Dobruja), bârzoi (Suceava, Craiova), buzoi (Ploiești, Bucharest, and northern Dobruja), bârloni, dârloni (Hunedoara), duroi (Oradea), cărăboi (Hunedoara), hârgoi, hang (Moldavia), ang (northern Dobruja), berbedeaua (Suceava), tarauz (Orșova), ţiitor (Oltenia), and bas (Ploiești, northern Dobruja).) produces a continuous low tone. It usually consists of two or three detachable sections, allowing pitch adjustment by altering the pipe's length. The outer sections are generally made of hardwood, while the middle section is made of softer wood; some examples end in a cow-horn bell. The drone typically sounds one or two octaves below the chanter.
- Melody pipe (chanter) (carabă): (Note: Regional names: cărabă (Transylvania), cărabie (Suceava), carava (Moldavia), and tarabă (northern Dobruja).) made of wood, most commonly plum, and fitted with finger holes for playing the melody.

Sound in both the drone and the chanter is produced by single idioglot reeds (ancie). The drone uses one reed, while the chanter may use one or two reeds in the case of double-chanter instruments.

=== Classification ===
Types of Romanian cimpoi
Type	Construction (number and arrangement of finger holes)	Distribution
Bagpipes with a single chanter (with one reed)
1.1	6 in front	Moldova
1.2	6 in front and 1 for the thumb in the back (at the level of the sixth front hole)	Northeastern Muntenia, Southeastern Moldavia
2	6 holes in front and 1 for the thumb in the back (above the front holes)	Muntenia, Oltenia
3	7 in front and 1 for the thumb in the back (connected to the seventh front hole)	Muntenia, Dobruja (sometimes called "Bulgarian")
Bagpipes with a double chanter (with two reeds)
4	Melody pipe: 5 in front; Accompaniment pipe: 1	Banat, Oltenia, Bukovina
5	Melody pipe: 6 in front and 1 for the thumb in the back; Accompaniment pipe: 1	Hunedoara and neighboring areas

Romanian bagpipes belong to the Eastern European type, as defined by Curt Sachs, characterized by a cylindrical chanter bore and the use of single reeds. The classification developed by Tiberiu Alexandru and later expanded by other researchers is based primarily on the construction of the chanter and distinguishes six main varieties.

A significant feature of several regional types of the Romanian cimpoi (Types 4 and 5) is the presence of a double chanter. In addition to the pipe carrying the main melody, these instruments have a second parallel pipe. This pipe functions as an additional drone with a variable pitch, usually alternating between a fifth and an octave in relation to the main drone, which allows the production of simple harmonic textures.

Type 3 bagpipes are virtually identical to Bulgarian bagpipes described by Rayna Katsarova. Their distinctive feature is the connection between the seventh finger hole on the front of the chanter and the eighth hole on the back by means of a short tube made from a goose quill that passes through the body of the pipe. As noted by the English organologist Anthony Baines, instruments of this type in Bulgaria may sometimes have a conical chanter bore, which is atypical for Eastern European bagpipes in general. Researchers have also documented the presence of this type in the southern regions of the present-day Republic of Moldova.

=== The problem of chanter bore classification in Soviet sources ===
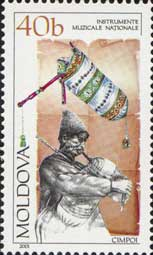
Cimpoi. Postage stamp of the Republic of Moldova.

In organological literature, differing descriptions exist regarding the internal shape of the chanter bore of the cimpoi used in the territory of the present-day Republic of Moldova. According to a number of classical studies, the traditional cimpoi of the historical region of Moldavia is characterized by a cylindrical bore and a single reed. This description corresponds both to field observations and to data from specialized organological research.

At the same time, Soviet encyclopedic publications – including the Atlas of Musical Instruments of the Peoples of the USSR, the Musical Encyclopedia, and the Great Soviet Encyclopedia – established a description of the Moldovan cimpoi as an instrument with an exclusively conical bore.

The Musical Encyclopedia, in its entry on the cimpoi, refers to a study by the Moldovan organologist Ion Vizitiu (1979). However, Vizitiu's work itself, as well as its expanded 1985 edition, describes an instrument with a cylindrical rather than a conical bore. The Great Soviet Encyclopedia relies on the book Moldovan Folk Musical Instruments (1964) by L. S. Berov, while the Atlas draws on the manuscript version of the same work. Berov does describe a cimpoi with a conical bore, but he includes an important qualification regarding the limited representativeness of the instrument examined, noting that his description refers specifically to the cimpoi of the Moldovan Folk Instrument Ensemble. (Note: The description refers to a specific, possibly unique example of the instrument. It was likely a specimen modified for orchestral use, or an instrument from southern Moldova that shows the influence of the “Bulgarian” type, which may have a conical bore.)

== Manufacturing ==
The air reservoir, or burduf, is the least durable component of the instrument and usually requires replacement every two to three years, whereas the wooden pipes may remain in use for several generations. It is most often made from the skin of a young goat, which is regarded as the most durable material. Sheep skin and, more rarely, dog skin (for example, in Dobruja) are also used. The animal skin is removed with particular care, pulled off whole “like a sock,” starting from the hind legs and drawn toward the head to avoid unnecessary cuts. The neck and front legs are cut relatively high, forming natural openings for the pipes, while the rear opening is sewn or tied closed.

One of the traditional methods used to process the skin involves rubbing the hide with salt and cornmeal, then stuffing it with hay or chaff. Wooden spacers are placed in the openings to prevent shrinkage, and the bag is left to dry for several days. In most cases, the skin is turned fur-side inward, which improves airtightness and protects the leather from moisture produced during playing. The wool inside the bag is carefully trimmed to prevent obstruction of airflow. Less commonly, the fur is left on the outside. According to Iosif Herțea, this construction is typical of relatively recent instruments or of certain regions, such as Vrancea. In such cases, the fur is often left long, and the bag may be fitted with a goat-shaped head, emphasizing the instrument's zoomorphic appearance and its symbolic associations.

The pipes are not inserted directly into the bag but are mounted in separate stocks (butuc or corn), made of wood or horn. The stock holding the chanter (carabă) serves as a protective chamber: the reeds are placed inside it and do not come into direct contact with the bag. This protects the fragile reeds and allows the chanter to be rotated freely during performance without interrupting the sound. Wooden stocks are often decorated with tin inlay, which not only serves a decorative purpose but also strengthens the wood.

The drone pipe (bâzoi) usually consists of three, more rarely two, telescoping sections. The first and third sections are typically made of hardwoods such as plum, cherry, or dogwood, while the middle section is made of softer woods, including elder or yew. The joints are sealed with thread or tow. This telescopic design allows the pitch of the drone to be adjusted by changing the overall length of the pipe. In some regions, such as Hunedoara, the drone ends with a decorative bell made of cow horn.

The chanter (carabă) is the most complex part of the instrument, as it determines both its type and tuning. Folk craftsmen traditionally make it without precise measuring tools, often copying older instruments. Plum wood is preferred, although other woods are also used. In the case of double chanters, two parallel channels are drilled by hand. Finger holes are also placed “by eye,” with attention to the comfort of the player's hands. Final tuning is achieved with beeswax, which is applied to partially cover finger holes and adjust pitch.

Sound production relies on a single idioglot reed, made from reed or elder. The vibrating tongue is cut into a short tube, usually 3–5 cm long, sometimes up to 8 cm. To prevent the tongue from sticking, a thin hair may be placed beneath its base. The reed used for the drone is structurally similar to that of the chanter but larger in size.

== Musical features and playing technique ==
External videos
- Cimpoi (music sample)
- Vasile Pârvulescu – Hora de mâna cimpoiereasca (Oltenia, 1930s)
- Dumitru Ristea – Oltenește, (Muntenia, 1930s)
- Ion Papuc – Nuneasca, (Muntenia)
- Nicolae Nemeș-Munteanu – Cântecul miresei, (Banat)
- Nicolae Nemeș-Munteanu & Gheorghe Cernescu – Brâu și sârbă din Cornereva, (Banat)
- Nicolae Nemeș-Munteanu, (Banat)
- Murguleţul, (Muntenia)
- Ion Văcaru – Brâu oltenesc, (Oltenia)
- Marin Chisăr – Joc din cimpoi, (Oltenia)
- Constantin Chisăr – Doina lui Ion Şarpe, (Oltenia, 1975)
- Nicolae Pleșa – Cadâneasca de la Negureni, (Dobrudja)
- Florea Netcu – Geamparalele & Brâul, (Dobrudja)
- Van Brândușan – Pe picior, (Timok, Vlachs of Serbia)
- Ion Lăceanu – Cântec de nuntă

The range of the cimpoi is limited to approximately one octave, without the possibility of extending it through overblowing. The scale is generally diatonic. Depending on tuning and regional type, it may correspond to a major mode (sometimes with a raised fourth degree, resembling the Lydian mode) or to a minor mode. As with many folk instruments, tuning does not strictly follow equal temperament, and certain scale degrees may sound slightly higher or lower, contributing to an archaic tonal character. Instruments with a double chanter often employ incomplete scales, in which certain degrees, such as the seventh, are absent. Beeswax is used to fine-tune intervals by adjusting the effective diameter of the finger holes.

Before performance, the musician tunes the instrument by first adjusting the chanter (or, in the case of a double chanter, tuning one pipe against the other) and then tuning the drone to the tonic, usually at the octave or double octave. Fingering varies by type, but typically the lower holes are covered with the fingers of the right hand and the upper holes with those of the left. The holes are usually closed with the finger joints rather than the fingertips.

Structurally, the cimpoi is a polyphonic instrument, as the melody unfolds against a continuous drone. This distinguishes it within Romanian traditional music, which has historically been predominantly monodic. Romanian researchers emphasize the role of double-chanter bagpipes, whose perfect fifth interval is regarded as one of the oldest forms of harmony in Romanian folklore. The alternating tones of the accompaniment pipe are interpreted as an early form of bass movement. Scholars have suggested that this drone-based polyphony influenced accompaniment practices in violin music and in the playing of the zongora in Maramureș, as well as characteristic cadential formulas found in Banat music.

Because airflow is continuous, articulation is achieved through ornamentation rather than tonguing. A staccato effect is produced by rapid finger movements, allowing the lowest open tone to briefly sound between notes. This short interjected sound is perceived not as part of the melody but as a rhythmic separator. Repeated notes are articulated through grace notes and other embellishments. On double-chanter instruments, additional rhythmic effects can be created by alternating between the two accompaniment tones.

Folk performers emphasize the difference between playing the cimpoi and the fluier. While articulation on the fluier may involve the tongue, articulation on the cimpoi relies exclusively on fingering and ornamentation due to the continuous airflow. As a result, the same melody performed on the cimpoi and on other instruments, such as the caval, acquires a markedly different character. The presence of an air reservoir also allows some performers to sing while playing, alternating vocal phrases with instrumental passages and using pauses in singing to replenish the air supply.

The repertory is characterized by stable structural formulas. Pieces are often introduced by a stereotyped opening that covers the instrument's full range and functions as a tuning check. Closing formulas are likewise standardized, frequently involving the addition of a sustained tone, such as the fifth, to the final tonic.

Because of its technical limitations, the cimpoi repertoire is relatively narrow. Although performers may know many melodies, only a limited number are suitable for the instrument, typically archaic tunes built on narrow ranges and repetitive motifs. These limitations contributed both to the preservation of an archaic playing style and, over time, to the gradual decline of the instrument's use as musical demands evolved.

Traditionally, the cimpoi was regarded as difficult to combine with other melodic instruments due to its tuning and volume. Percussion instruments were therefore the most common accompaniment. In Muntenia, the cimpoi was often paired with a large drum (tobă), and performers sometimes attached bells to their legs to mark the rhythm. In Hunedoara, during winter caroling (colindă), the bagpipe was played together with small drums (dube). Folk performers noted that such rhythmic accompaniment enhanced the instrument's sound. Mixed ensembles with melodic instruments also existed historically. In the Banat, the cimpoi and violin were sometimes played together, and 19th-century visual sources depict ensembles including bagpipes, fluier, and drum.

== Imitation of the cimpoi sound ==
Imitation of the bagpipe's sound is a common technique in Romanian folk music, used to expand the timbral and textural possibilities of other instruments. A particularly archaic practice involves playing the fluier while simultaneously producing a continuous vocal drone (ison gâjâit, ison gutural). In this technique, the performer sustains a low chest tone while playing the melody, creating a two-voice texture analogous to that of the bagpipe. Some researchers interpret this practice not merely as imitation, but as a vocal-instrumental prototype of the cimpoi that predates the physical separation of melody and drone. Moldavian musocologist Vasile Chiseliță has suggested that this principle of droning was later realized in the construction of instruments such as the cimpoi and the double fluier.

Additional imitation effects on the fluier are achieved by closing the lower opening of the instrument, using either a finger or a small plug of paper or bread. This alters timbre and intonation and produces a drone-like effect. Such techniques are employed in Oltenia in pieces explicitly referring to bagpipe imitation, including Cimpoiul, Hora din cimpoi, Sârba din cimpoi, and Sârba înfundată.

In violin music, especially in Transylvania and Maramureș, bagpipe imitation is achieved through specific bowing techniques and double stops that simulate a continuous drone. Béla Bartók documented this phenomenon in 1912–1913, noting numerous dance melodies in which the fluier in Bihor, as well as the fluier and the violin in Maramureș imitate cimpoi playing. He suggested that this reflected an earlier stage in which the cimpoi served as the primary dance instrument. This interest later influenced Bartók's own compositions, such as the first movement of his Sonatina for solo piano (1915), titled Dudások (“Bagpipers”), (Note: In a 1945 radio interview, Bartók explained that this movement presents two themes depicting dances performed by two bagpipers. To accurately convey the continuous hum of the drone, Bartók specifically insisted on strict adherence to his pedal markings.) and the Musette movement of Out of Doors (1926).

== Traditional use and functions ==
=== Pastoral life ===
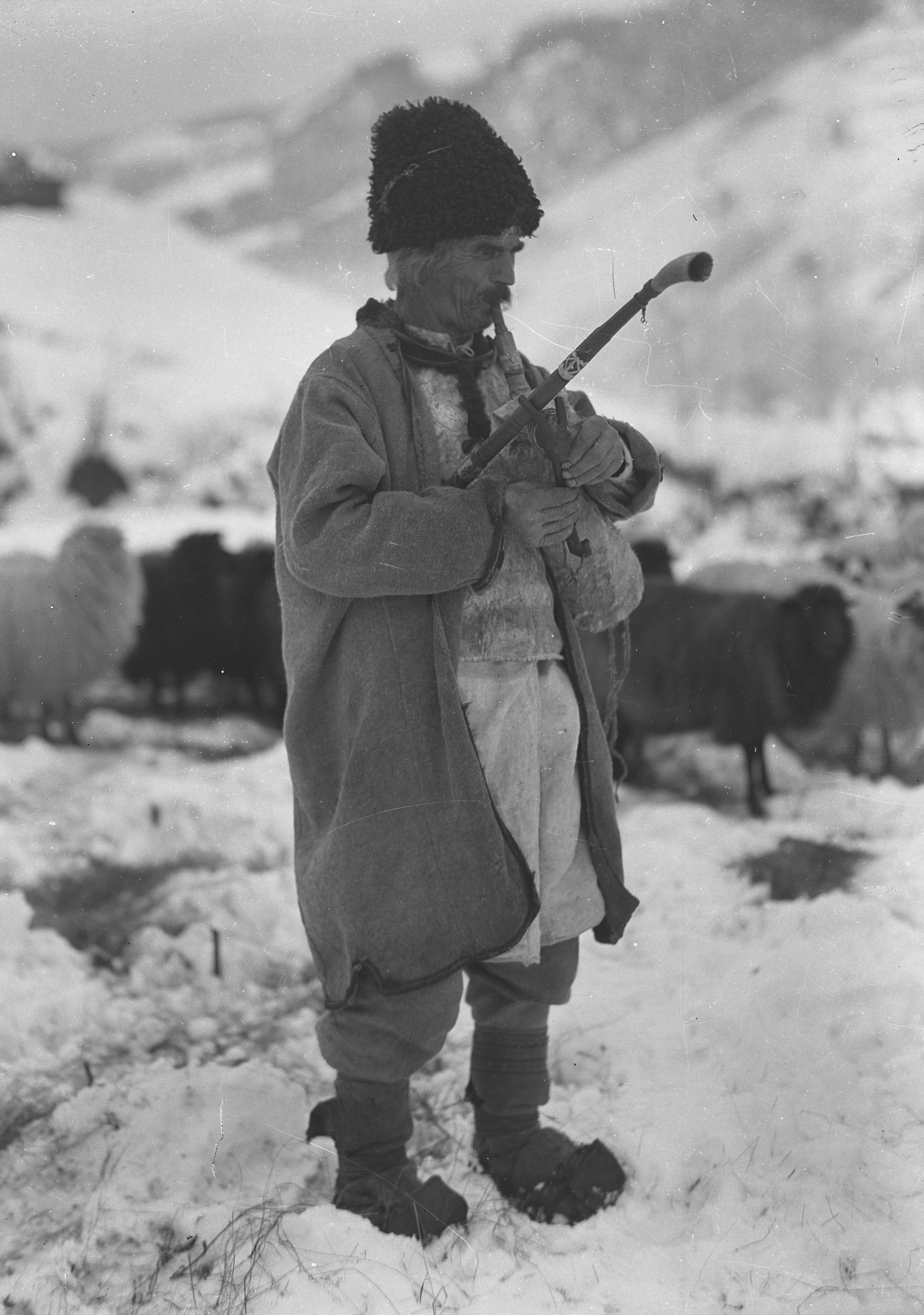
Shepherd with a cimpoi (Hunedoara, Transylvania, first half of the 20th century). Photo by Denis Galloway.

Historically, the cimpoi was closely associated with pastoral life and, together with the fluier, served as a principal instrument of shepherds. It was typically played by shepherds spending long periods in isolation with their flocks. Folk belief held that the sound of the bagpipe had a calming effect on animals and helped keep them together while grazing. Musical skills were transmitted orally in this environment, with younger shepherds learning by imitation. Tiberiu Alexandru cites the testimony of the Bukovinian bagpiper Gheorghe Mușuleac, who described learning to play while tending sheep alongside older shepherds. A characteristic pastoral piece is When the shepherd lost his sheep, performed on the cimpoi as well as on the fluier and caval.

=== Ritual practice ===
Until the early 20th century, the cimpoi was an essential, and often the sole, instrument at village weddings. In Bukovina, it was traditionally said that weddings were accompanied only by the bagpipe, with violins appearing later. In parts of Hunedoara, this practice persisted at weddings of poorer villagers into the second half of the 20th century. In the Banat, the cimpoi played an important role in winter calendar rituals until the late 20th century, accompanying caroling groups during colindă.

=== Dance music ===
Before the widespread appearance of professional ensembles (taraf), village dances (horă) were commonly accompanied by the cimpoi or the fluier, whose volume made them suitable for outdoor performance. Over time, the cimpoi was replaced by instruments such as the violin, clarinet, and accordion. Nevertheless, in some conservative communities in Oltenia, Hunedoara, and Bihor, dancing to the bagpipe continued into the late 20th century.

=== Dance of the puppets ===
A rare and distinctive practice is the Dance of the puppets (Jocul păpușilor), which combines music with folk puppet theater. While playing a dance melody, the bagpiper simultaneously manipulates small wooden marionettes using threads attached to the fingers or legs. This practice is made possible by the air reservoir, which frees the performer from continuous blowing. Such performances traditionally took place at weddings, fairs, and communal gatherings.

== Cultural perception and beliefs ==
In Romanian folk culture, attitudes toward the cimpoi have ranged from respect for its pastoral associations to distrust linked to its role in entertainment and its association with poverty. In 16th- and 17th-century sources, court bagpipers are sometimes described as măscării, participants in buffoonish performances. Church texts of the period often condemned bagpipe playing as sinful and grouped bagpipers with sorcerers and astrologers.

Legends concerning the instrument's origin reflect broader symbolic oppositions between divine and diabolical forces. In one widespread narrative, God creates the sheep and the fluier, while the devil creates the goat and the cimpoi. In some versions, the devil is unable to make the instrument sound until God intervenes by adding tuning wax, thereby neutralizing its demonic nature.

The symbolism of the cimpoi is largely connected to the materials traditionally used in its construction. The goat, whose skin commonly forms the bag, was associated in folklore with the devil, as was the dog, whose skin was occasionally used. These associations extended to the instrument itself, particularly when the chanter stock was carved in the shape of a goat's head. Folk belief held that a pact with the devil could produce an enchanted cimpoi capable of playing by itself.

Bagpipers were often viewed as marginal figures. It was believed that only “marked” individuals – those who were disabled, lame, blind, or socially marginalized – could play the instrument. Such traits were interpreted as the price paid for a supernatural gift. Iosif Herțea compared the bagpiper's social position to that of the solomonari, legendary sorcerers. These ideas are reflected in proverbs and riddles, such as the Transylvanian saying: “He who wants to play the cimpoi – his road leads to hell.”

== Modern state ==
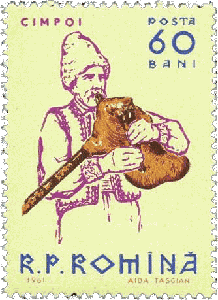
Cimpoi. Postage stamp of Romania.

Despite the decline of village traditions, the cimpoi continues to play a role in contemporary musical life in several regions of Romania. Organized amateur folklore ensembles attached to cultural centers have contributed significantly to preserving interest in the instrument. Within this context, performance practices are often adapted to stage requirements, including fixed repertoires and standardized styles. From the perspective of safeguarding intangible cultural heritage, this process is generally regarded as positive.

New performance formats have also emerged, including bagpipe ensembles. Although the cimpoi was traditionally a solo instrument, stage ensembles often perform in unison, or feature a soloist supported by sustained tones or antiphonal exchanges with the group.

In addition to traditional village performers, the cimpoi is used by professional folk musicians and multi-instrumentalists in Romania and the Republic of Moldova, including Marin Chisăr, Constantin Chisăr, Ion Ionescu, Ion Lăceanu, Nicolae Pleșa (Romania), Leonid Moșanu, Petre Zaharia, and Liubomir Iorga (Republic of Moldova).

== Sources ==
- Burada, Teodor T. (1877). "Cercetări asupra danţurilor şi instrumentelor de musică ale românilor" [Research on the dances and musical instruments of the Romanians]. Almanah Musical (in Romanian). 3. Iași: 51–79.
- Schlesinger, Kathleen (1911). "Symphonia" . Encyclopædia Britannica. Vol. 26 (11th ed.). p. 289.
- Bartók, Béla (1913). Cântece poporale româneşti din comitatul Bihor (Ungaria) [Romanian folk songs from Bihor County (Hungary)] (in Romanian). Bucureşti: Socec & comp. şi C. Sfetea. p. 360.
- Brăiloiu, Constantin (1931). "Esquissse d'une méthode de folklore musical" [Outline of a method of musical folklore]. Revue de musicologie (in French) (40): 233–267. doi:10.2307/925649. JSTOR 925649.
- Katsarova, Rayna (1936). "Gaydite na edin shumenski maystor" Гайдите на един шуменски майстор [The bagpipes of a Shumen master]. Izvestiya Na Narodniya Etnografski Muzey V Sofiya (in Bulgarian). 12: 89–110.
- Alexandru, Tiberiu (1956). Instrumentele muzicale ale poporului romîn [The musical instruments of the Romanian people] (in Romanian). Bucureşti: Editura de stat pentru literatură şi artă.
- Baines, Anthony (1960). Bagpipes. Occasional Papers on Technology. Vol. 9. Oxford: Oxford University Press.
- Chiselița, V. D. (1990). "Pastusheskaya fleyta "fluer lung": instrument, areal bytovaniya, osobennosti ispolneniya" Пастушеская флейта «флуер лунг»: инструмент, ареал бытования, особенности исполнения. Moldavskiy Muzykal'nyy Fol'klor I Yego Pretvoreniye V Kompozitorskom Tvorchestve (in Russian). Chișinău: Știința: 19–36 – via Shepherd's flute "fluer lung": instrument, habitat area, performance features.
- Vertkov, K. A., ed. (1963). Atlas muzykal'nykh instrumentov narodov SSSR Атлас музыкальных инструментов народов СССР [Atlas of musical Instruments of the peoples of the USSR] (in Russian). Moscow: Gosudarstvennoye muzykal'noye izdatel'stvo.
- Berov, L. S. (1964). Moldavskiye muzykal'nyye narodnyye instrumenty Молдавские музыкальные народные инструменты [Moldovan Folk Musical Instruments] (in Russian). Chișinău: Cartea moldoveneasca.
- Sachs, Curt (1967). Handbuch der Musikinstrumentenkunde [Handbook of Musical Instrument Studies] (in German). Hildesheim: Georg Olms.
- Habenicht, Gottfried (1974). "Die rumänischen Sackpfeifen" [The Romanian bagpipes]. Jahrbuch für Volksliedforschung (in German). 19. Freiburg i.Br.: Zentrum für Populäre Kultur und Musik: 117–150. doi:10.2307/846574. ISSN 0075-2789. JSTOR 846574.
- Bartók, Béla (1975). Benjamin Suchoff (ed.). Rumanian Folk Music. Maramureș County. Vol. 5. The Hague: Martinus Nijhoff. doi:10.1007/978-94-010-1686-5. ISBN 978-94-010-1688-9.
- Prokhorov, A. M., ed. (1978). Bol'shaya sovetskaya entsiklopediya Большая советская энциклопедия [Great Soviet encyclopedia] (in Russian). Vol. 29 (3rd ed.). Moscow: Sovetskaya entsiklopediya.
- Vizitiu, Ion (1979). Instrumentele muzicale populare moldoveneşti [Moldovan folk musical instruments] (in Romanian). Chișinău: Literatura artistică.
- Keldysh, Yu. V., ed. (1982). Muzykal'naya entsiklopediya Музыкальная энциклопедия [Musical encyclopedia] (in Russian). Vol. 6. Moscow: Sovetskaya entsiklopediya.
- Vizitiu, Jean (Ion) (1985). Moldavskiye narodnyye muzykal'nyye instrumenty Молдавские народные музыкальные инструменты [Moldovan Folk Musical Instruments] (in Russian). Chișinău: Literatura artistică.
- Yeomans, David (1988). Bartók for piano. Bloomington and Indianapolis: Indiana University Press. ISBN 0-253-31006-7.
- Herţea, Iosif (1994). "Cimpoiul și diavolul" [The bagpipe and the devil]. Revista de Etnografie şi Folclor (in Romanian). 39 (1–2). București: 89–109.
- Tătulea, Viorica (1999). "Instrumente muzicale tradiţionale în Oltenia" [Traditional musical instruments in Oltenia]. Oltenia. Studii și comunicări. IX Seria etnografie (in Romanian). 9. Craiova: Editura Aius: 32–62. ISBN 973-9251-58-7.
- Sadie, Stanley; Tyrrell, John, eds. (2001). The New Grove Dictionary of Music and Musicians (2nd ed.). New York: Macmillan Publishers Limited. ISBN 0-333-60800-3.
- Babii, Vladimir (2012). Studiu de organologie [Organological study] (in Romanian) (2nd ed.). Chișinău: Elena V.I. ISBN 978-9975-4346-5-2.
- Libin, Laurence, ed. (2014). The Grove Dictionary of Musical Instruments. Vol. 1 (2nd ed.). New York: Oxford University Press. ISBN 978-0-19-935030-8.
- Ciuculescu, Traian (2014). Cimpoiul la români [The bagpipe among the Romanians] (in Romanian). Râmnicu-Vâlcea: Editura Fântâna lui Manole. ISBN 978-606-8641-00-3.
- Papană, Ovidiu (2019). Instrumente tradiționale românești. Studii acustico-muzicale [Romanian traditional instruments. Musical-acoustic studies] (in Romanian). Vol. 2. București: Editura Etnologică. ISBN 978-606-8830-54-4.

== External sources ==
- Papuc, Ion (1932). "Cînd si-a perdut ciobanul oile" [When the shepherd has lost his sheep]. Fonds Constantin Brailoiu (in Romanian). Archived from the original on 2025-06-12.
- Chiseliţă, Vasile (2011). "Când şi-a pierdut ciobanul oile" [When the shepherd has lost his sheep]. Patrimoniul cultural imaterial al Republicii Moldova (in Romanian). Ministerul Culturii al Republicii Moldova. Archived from the original on 2024-11-04.
- Eliznik (2018). "Discography: pipe musicians". eliznik.org. Archived from the original on 2023-12-07.
