= Romanian folk violin =

Romanian lăutari bowed string instrument

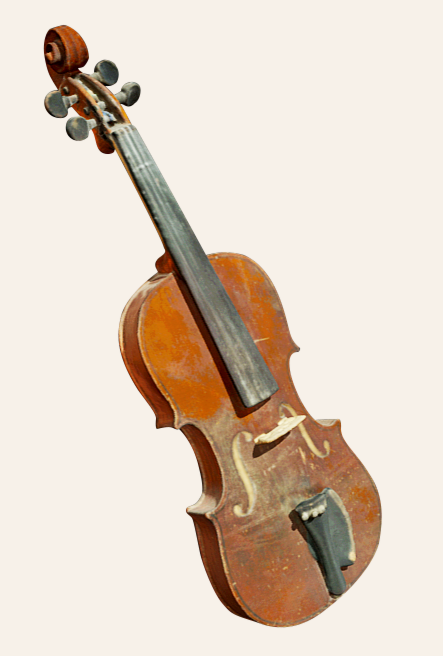
- Violin, Muntenia, first half of the 20th century
- Other names: vioară, lăută, diblă, ceteră, scripcă, higheghe, țibulcă, braci
- Classification: Chordophone
- Hornbostel–Sachs classification: 321.322-71 (Composite chordophone sounded by a bow)

The Romanian folk violin (Romanian: vioară, /viˈo̯a.rə/; also diblă, scripcă, ceteră, higheghe, țibulcă, braci) is a bowed string musical instrument and the associated performance tradition that plays a leading role in Romanian lăutărească music. Unlike indigenous Romanian folk instruments (for example, the fluier and the cimpoi), the Romanian violin was adopted into folk culture from broader European musical practice. The earliest reliable written references to it in the Romanian principalities date to the mid-17th century, and by the beginning of the 19th century it had become established throughout the Romanian lands. The violin became primarily an instrument of professional musicians – lăutari, many of them Romani – who adapted it to local repertoire, ensemble performance, and regional playing styles.

The musical language of the Romanian folk violin emerged from the blending of Ottoman-influenced and Western European musical traditions. It is characterized by non-tempered intonation, microchromatic inflections, elaborate ornamentation, and extensive use of scordatura. The rhythmic organization of lăutari violin music includes both symmetrical dance structures and asymmetrical rhythmic models (aksak), alongside a flexible approach to metre. In lăutari practice, the violin partly inherited techniques and expressive principles from earlier instruments, including the keman and the cimpoi, and often imitated their sound.

Lăutari usually played factory-made violins, but frequently modified them and adapted them to local performance practice: they added sympathetic strings, altered the bridge, and introduced other structural changes to obtain particular timbres or tunings. Romanian folk violin tradition also preserves distinctive methods of holding both the instrument and the bow, differing significantly from academic violin schools. Different ethnographic regions developed their own forms of the instrument and local playing techniques; regional variants include the Transylvanian accompanying violin (braci), the cetera (Note: Pronounced as /ˈtʃe.tə.rə/.) of Țara Oașului, and folk variants of the Stroh violin.

In the traditional ensemble (taraf), the violin leads the melody, improvises upon it, and largely determines the character of the ensemble sound. Its repertoire includes dance, lyrical, epic, and ritual music, while training in the lăutari tradition is based on oral transmission of repertoire and playing techniques. The influence of Romanian lăutari violin culture extended beyond folk practice: 20th-century classical composers such as Béla Bartók and George Enescu adopted violin techniques, rhythmic models, and ensemble principles from lăutari musicians and taraf performance. In 2020 Romania nominated the taraf ensemble tradition for inscription on UNESCO's Representative List of the Intangible Cultural Heritage of Humanity.

== History and origins ==
The earliest known mention of bowed-string playing in Wallachia and Moldavia appears in the chronicle of the Polish historian Maciej Stryjkowski (1582): "Of him, the Moldavians and Wallachians sing unceasingly at every feast, playing along on Serbian fiddles in their own tongue: 'Stephen, Stephen, voivode! Stephen, Stephen, voivode! He smote the Turks! He beat the Tatars! He smote the Hungarians, Ruthenians, and Poles!'" (Polish: O tym Wołoszy i Multani śpiewają ustawicznie w każdej biesiedzie na serbskich skrzypicach przygrawając swoim językiem: „Stephan, Stephan, wojewoda! Stephan, Stephan, wojewoda! bijał Turków! bił Tatarów! bijał Węgrów, Ruś i Polaków!.) The Italian monk Niccolò Barsi, who visited the Principality of Moldavia, noted in 1640 that dances used violins, bagpipes, pipes, drums, and three-string lutes (Italian: violini, sordelline, piffari, tamburi, collascioni con tre corde). The word vioară appears in a Romanian translation of The Teachings of Neagoe Basarab to His Son Teodosie (Învățăturile lui Neagoe Basarab către fiul său Teodosie) made around 1650. The same period includes the first mentions of specific performers: a 1675 document refers to "Ivan the violinist from Tătărani" (Romanian: Ivan viorarul ot Tătărani). The sources preserve no information about the construction of the instruments called viori in the 17th century.

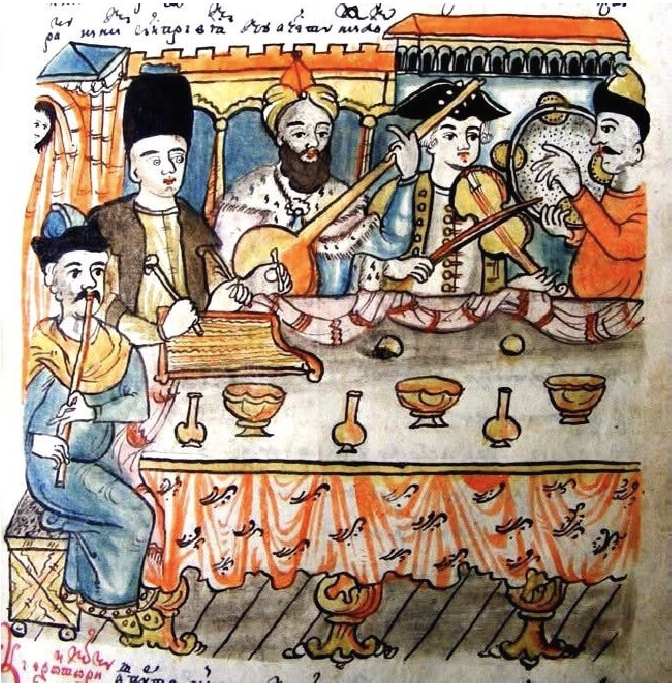
"Lăutari." Illustration for the Romanian translation of the romance Erotokritos, 1787. Artist: Petrache Logofătul.

From the 18th century onward, sources become more numerous and detailed. The French historian Jean‑Louis Carra, who visited Iași in 1775, described Romani musicians playing the violin, the cobza, and a pipe with eight holes (French: Le violon, la guittare allemande, & un sifflet à huit embouchures...). (Note: The term "German guitar" normally denoted a cittern, though the instrument intended here is likely the cobza. The "pipe with eight holes" is the nai.) The Austrian historian Franz Josef Sulzer, in his History of Transalpine Dacia (1781), noted that lăutari usually played one or two violins, sometimes accompanied by the nai or the cobza. In the illustrated manuscript of the Romanian translation of Erotokritos (1787), the violin is mentioned; in the same manuscript the artist depicts it as a standard violin with a bow shaped like an arch, and the violinist is the only musician dressed in European clothing. In 1820 the British consul in Moldavia and Wallachia, William Wilkinson, noted "the instruments mostly used are the common violin, the Pan-pipe, and a kind of guitar or lute peculiar to the country". One of the earliest depictions of the violin is a church fresco from 1784 in Lunca Asău (Bacău County, Moldavia), where the painter placed a violinist into a "Last Judgment" scene. In this period the clergy often viewed the violin as a reprehensible instrument associated with secular amusements; for that reason, in religious painting violinists were often shown in infernal scenes as companions of sinners.

The violin gradually displaced earlier bowed instruments. Sulzer mentions die Kiemany – an instrument with a convex back like a mandolin, played with a bow while held on the knee. Researchers connect it with Turkish: kemençe rumi (Byzantine lyra). (Note: Also known as the classical Turkish kemençe (Turkish: fasıl kemençesi).) The Romanian folklorist Teodor T. Burada also mentions another "keman" with six or seven main strings and the same number of sympathetic strings. By description it resembles the "chest keman" (Turkish: sînekemani), a borrowed variant of the European viole d'amour, held against the chest while playing. Even at the beginning of the 19th century, the keman enjoyed high status among the upper strata in Moldavia and Wallachia, and boyars took lessons from well-known musicians of the time. Another instrument displaced by the violin in the 18th–19th centuries was the hurdy-gurdy (known as Romanian: liră, lăută or organ), in which sound is produced by a wooden wheel rubbing the strings; by the mid‑19th century it survived mainly among itinerant blind musicians in northern Moldavia and Transylvania.

By the early 19th century, the violin had definitively established itself throughout the Romanian lands. It spread widely due to its technical possibilities: it could convey the intricate ornamentation of fast dances and extended improvisations in doinas while imitating the human voice. During the 19th century, a virtuoso performance style developed within lăutari culture, with the violin occupying the leading role.

== Regional names and terminology ==
- Field recordings
- Muntenia
- Oltenia
- Moldavia and Bukovina
- Maramureș
- Transylvania
- Oaș
- Bihor/Crișana

The main and generally accepted name of the instrument in both folk and scholarly usage is vioară, more rarely violină. In the Romanian translation of Erotokritos (1787) a diminutive form, violiță, is used. According to Burada, the term vioară originally referred to the viola, so a diminutive was later applied to the smaller instrument – the violin.

Alongside the standard name, numerous regional folk terms remain in use. In Moldavia the instrument is also called scripca, whereas in Transylvania, as well as in Maramureș and Țara Oașului, the archaic name ceteră (also citeră, tieceră) is common, deriving from Latin: cithara. In Bihor the name higheghe (higheză), borrowed from Hungarian, is used, while in western Oltenia and southern Transylvania diblă (also diplă) occurs. In some villages of Dobruja the Bulgarian-derived name țibulca is found. A separate term is lăută (also laută). Historically it referred to a type of lute or cobza, but over time it also came to denote the violin. In that meaning it is used in southern Transylvania and southern Moldavia (lăută), and in the Banat, Hunedoara, and parts of Muntenia (laută).

Names for performers are normally derived from local instrument terms: ceteraș; scripcar or scripcaș; diblaș; higheduș or highediș; and the most common lăutar or lăutaș. In the past, zicălaș (from Romanian: zicală, "dance tune") and Slavonic-derived igreț (player) were also used.

Traditional names for violin parts also vary regionally. The bow is called arcuș, more rarely arc or harc. In the 20th century in Muntenia older string names still survived: the lowest (G) was sârmă ("wire"), the second (D) burdui, burdoi or rag (cf. bourdon, an older term for a drone), the third (A) mijloc ("middle"), and the highest (E) subțire ("thin"). In modern practice, folk musicians more often use German-derived letter names: ghe, de, a and e.

== Lăutari tradition and the violin's role in folk music ==
In lăutărească music, the violin occupies a central place. Unlike indigenous instruments such as the fluier or cimpoi, which were made by rural communities from locally available materials for communal and personal use, the violin was a purchased and relatively expensive instrument. For this reason, it did not become widespread in everyday rural life and instead became primarily an instrument of professional musicians – lăutari – among whom a significant proportion were Romani. For them, playing at celebrations and rituals was a profession, and musical skills and repertoire were usually transmitted within the family. Lăutari adapted the borrowed instrument to local aesthetics, imitating vocal intonations and the sound of older wind instruments. As a result, a distinct performance style developed: folk violinists use characteristic bowings, elaborate melismatic ornamentation, and various scordaturas, producing a recognizably "folk" sound. Despite its foreign origin, the violin was fully assimilated into the folk environment. Romanian ethnomusicologist Tiberiu Alexandru argues that this borrowing enriched folk expression without displacing its originality.

== Construction and structural features ==
In construction, the Romanian folk violin generally corresponds to the standard violin, but performance practice led to a number of modifications. Lăutari usually play factory-made instruments, though local violin makers remain active in many regions as well. After acquiring an instrument, musicians often modify it themselves in order to adapt it to local performance requirements. For example, Constantin Brăiloiu observed in 1938 that a lăutar from Vrancea had scraped away some wood from the top plate in an attempt to make the sound less "wooden".

In some regions the standard four-string violin was sometimes supplemented with a fifth sympathetic string. This was a thin metal string placed between the G and D strings. Two tuning variants are attested: in Târgoviște it was often tuned to g^{1} to strengthen resonance of the open bass string, while in parts of Târgoviște and in the Făgăraș region it was tuned to C. An extra peg was installed for fastening. The fifth string was purely sympathetic: the performer never touched it with either the bow or the fingers of the left hand. It vibrated solely through resonance, enriching the instrument's timbre and reinforcing related overtones.

In Vrancea an even more complex modification occurs, with five, six, or seven sympathetic strings called teluri by local lăutari. (Note: Teluri (sing. Romanian: tel, from Turkish: tel "metal string") – in Romanian tradition, this may refer to the thinnest strings of string instruments.) As resonators, ordinary E strings are used, fixed under the main strings in a special scheme so as not to interfere with bowing. (Note: The lower ends are attached to the end button and run directly under the fingerboard; they pass through a "two-tier" bridge (main strings on the upper edge, sympathetic strings through holes or on a lower tier), then run under the fingerboard and over a metal nut into the pegbox where extra pegs hold them.) Their tuning varies with performer preference and experience. Musicians describe the effect in their own terms as making the instrument to "respond to the voice" and giving it a "sweeter" timbre. The construction ultimately derives from the Eastern keman (Turkish: sînekemani), which possessed between four to seven sympathetic strings of the same type. Sources also indicate that violins equipped with sympathetic strings formerly existed in Oltenia.

Older lăutari, especially in the Târgoviște area, used a distinctive method of storing rosin (Romani: makló). They melted it and glued it directly onto the instrument, on the back of the neck. This allowed musicians during crowded weddings to apply rosin quickly to the bow (or occasionally to the fingers) during short pauses between dances without searching for it in pockets or instrument cases.

=== Cetera in Oaș ===
To obtain an extremely high tuning, sometimes reaching a perfect fifth above the classical violin pitch, folk makers in Țara Oașului significantly rework purchased violins (ceteras). The first three strings are shifted one position toward the bass side, so that the fourth string is tuned to D instead of G, while the first string is raised to B. The bridge is also heavily reworked: filed down by several millimetres and made considerably flatter. This brings strings closer together, facilitating the playing of double stops while also increasing volume. To shorten the vibrating string length and facilitate tuning in the high register, the bridge and soundpost are moved upward toward the neck. The tailpiece is repositioned accordingly in order to preserve the correct afterlength. As a result of these modifications, the cetera becomes a specialized instrument capable of projecting above the piercing vocal style characteristic of Oaș singing traditions.

=== Violin with horn ===
A specific adaptation, most common in Bihor and parts of Arad, is the "violin with horn" (Romanian: vioară cu goarnă), also known as lăută cu tolcer. Structurally, it is a simplified folk variant of the Stroh violin. Its resonant body is replaced by a mica membrane on which the bridge is set; one or two metal horns amplify the sound. It produces a metallic, nasal timbre and has strong projection. Although today it is centered mainly in Bihor and Arad, historically this type also spread to the Năsăud and Mureș areas (Banat), as well as Oltenia and Muntenia.

=== Accompanying violins ===
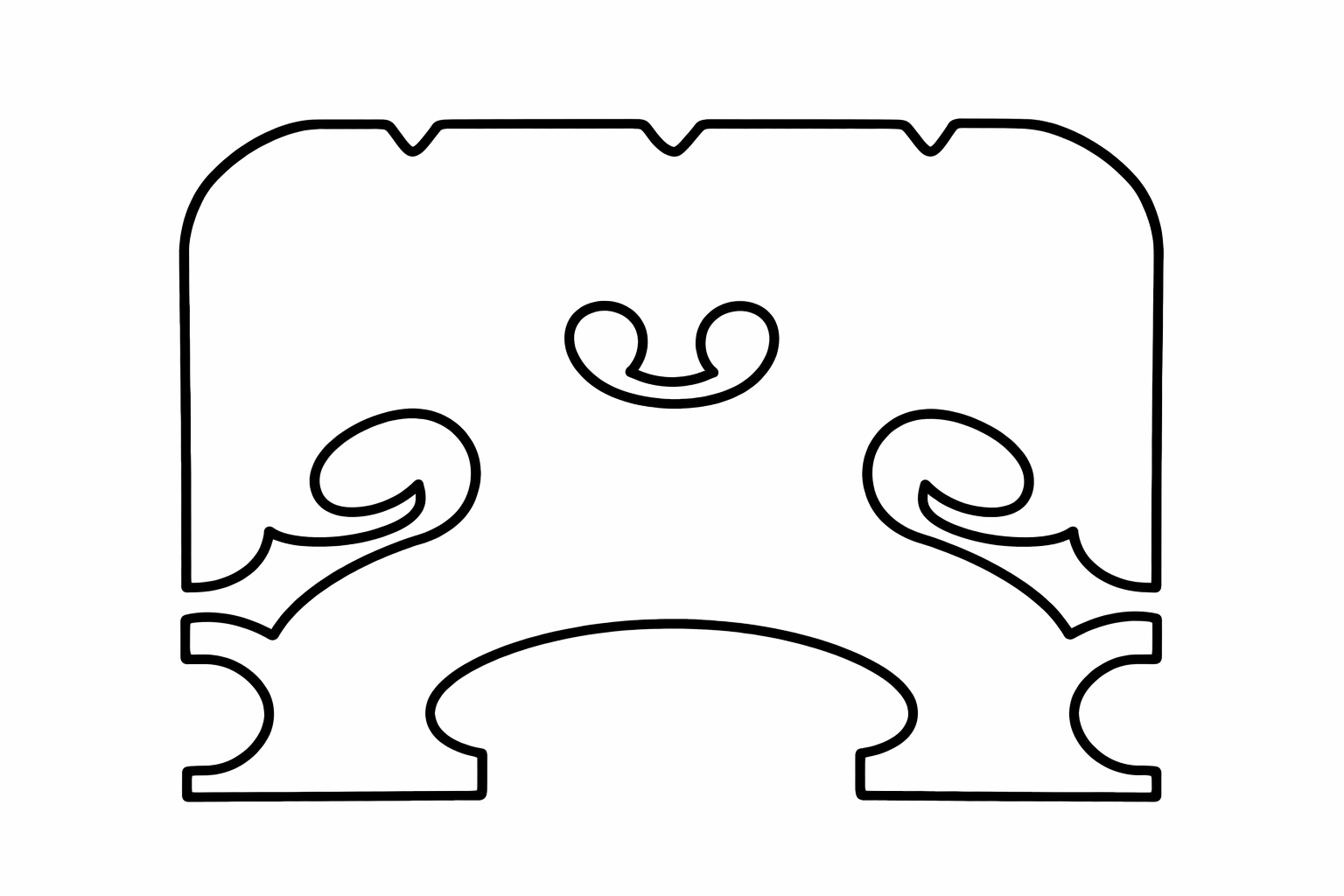
Bridge of a three-string braci, Transylvania

Violins intended for harmonic accompaniment are known in Transylvania (Năsăud, Mureș and Cluj regions) and in northern Banat under the name braci (Romanian: braci; variants: săcundă, coantră, contralaucă). These are modified violins (and occasionally violas) fitted with three strings and a flattened bridge. Their playing technique excludes melody performance. Because of the flat bridge, the bow touches all strings simultaneously, allowing performers to produce full triads with a single bow stroke while forming the required harmonies with the left hand.

== Musical language ==
The musical language of Romanian lăutari combines Eastern and Western European traditions. According to the American ethnomusicologist Robert Garfias, throughout the 19th–20th centuries lăutari integrated two distinct aesthetic systems: Turkish makam and Western major–minor harmony. Over time they simplified many of the strict rules associated with the makam and largely abandoned its traditional terminology, yet preserved important modal features in performance practice. As a result, lăutari music frequently departs from the norms of Western tonal organization. One of the most widespread modal types in lăutărească music is a Hijaz-type makam, sometimes referred to in Turkish tradition as the Gypsy makam.

=== Intonation and ornamentation ===
Musicians use a non-tempered intonational system in which melodic movement is guided not by fixed scale degrees but by the tendency of particular pitches to be consistently raised or lowered toward neighbouring reference tones. This produces a microchromatic effect. The preservation of Eastern makam structures is supported by instrumental analysis of field recordings. For example, analysis of a recording by the violinist Aurel Gore in the song Cântec la masă mare demonstrates a consistent lowering of the second scale degree by approximately two commas. Such an intonational deviation corresponds to practices in makams such as Dügah and Saba and indicates the continued survival of makam principles in lăutărească music.

An essential element of the musical language is elaborate ornamentation, known among musicians as "little flowers" (Romanian: floricele). It includes mordents, trills, and grace notes. Performers who play without such embellishments are described as playing "straight" or "simply". Beyond standard ornaments, musicians employ so-called "false lăutari trills", consisting of intense tremolo combined with brief touches of an upper auxiliary note. Glissando and portamento are also widely used, serving both for attacks from below or above and for expressive connections between tones. Violinists of the Moldavian school, such as Constantin Lupu, are particularly noted for short terminal glissandi at the ends of musical phrases.

=== Rhythmic organization ===
Rhythmic organization combines symmetrical and asymmetrical structures. Dance repertoire widely employs aksak – a system of irregular metres. Typical examples include the seven-beat geampara with the internal subdivision 2+2+3 and the nine-beat cadînească (2+2+2+3).

In lyrical genres, rhythmic organization underwent significant transformation after incorporation into professional lăutari practice. Whereas rural doinas are performed in free rhythm without accompaniment, lăutari tarafs developed a different model. The solo violin part, or vocal line, retains a free rhythmic character, while the ensemble accompanies it in strict metre, typically in the tempo of a fast hora. This contrast between a freely unfolding melody and a metrically regulated accompaniment is one of the defining features of professional lăutari performance.

Micro-rhythmic unevenness appears as deviations from a steady pulse, present even in symmetrical dance genres. Instead of equal subdivisions (for example 4+4), performers create irregular proportions ranging approximately from 5+4 to 11+9. Instrumental measurements reveal persistent ratios between long and short beats ranging from about 0.73 to 0.80 (where 1.0 would indicate perfect evenness), producing a characteristic "wobbling" pulse that is difficult to represent accurately within Western metric notation. At medium and faster tempi, while the duple metre of the accompanying pulse remains clear and fixed, the melodic line and the subdivisions of the accompaniment depart from strictly duple organization – permutations of 8 or 16 beats – in favour of 12-beat permutations. The resulting rhythmic effect has been compared to similar structures in certain forms of American jazz. In ensemble performance, this effect is reinforced by so-called "harmonic delay", whereby accompanying instruments such as the cimbalom and double bass change harmonies slightly after the melodic line of the first violin. This creates a characteristic rhythmic tension and contributes significantly to the dynamic character of taraf performance.

== Tuning and scordatura ==
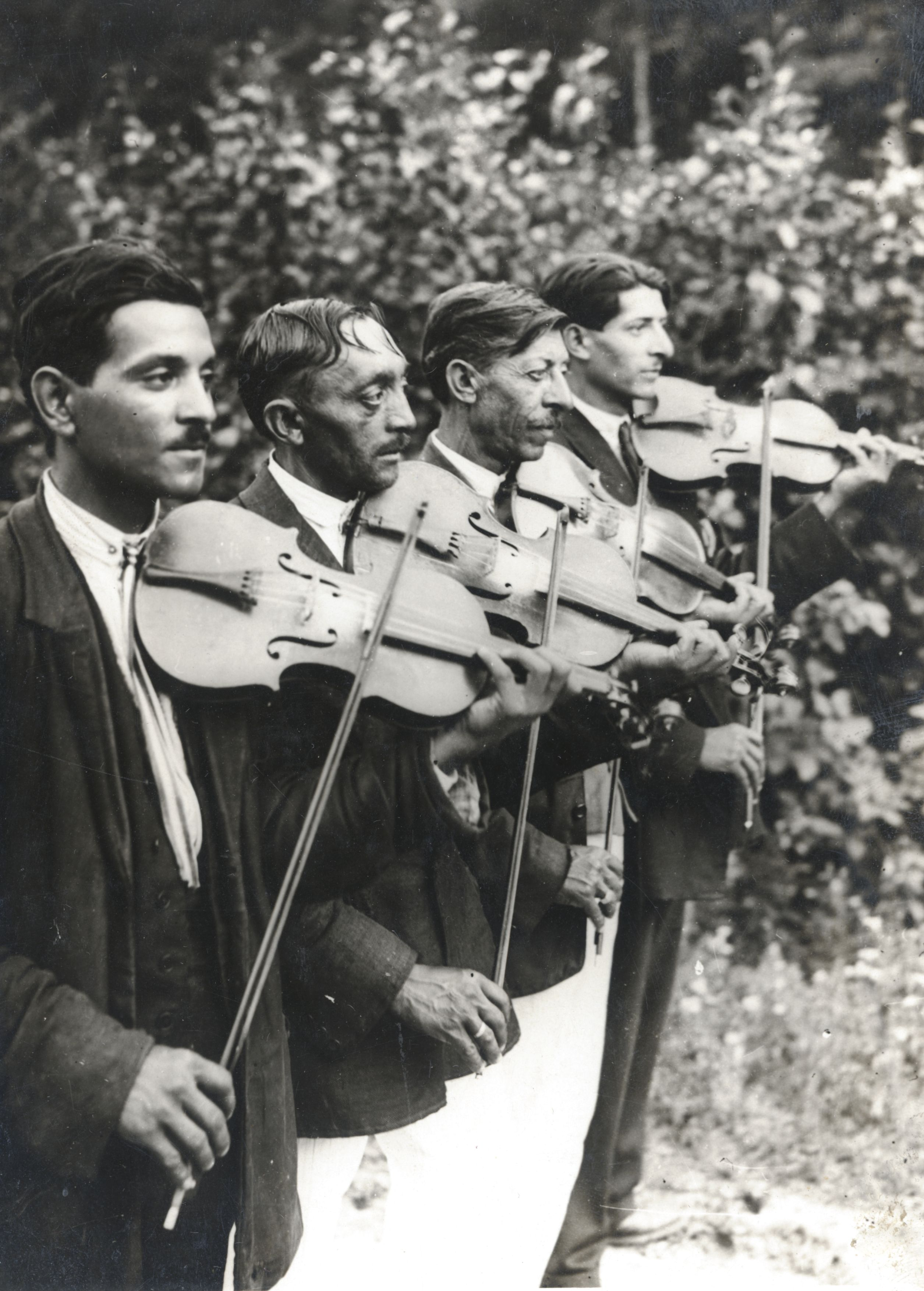
Lăutari violinists, Oltenia (1930)

Violin tuning is not tied to an absolute standard pitch (concert pitch); lăutari deliberately vary pitch level according to regional traditions, repertoire, and acoustic conditions. Relative to the standard tuning (G–D^{1}–A^{1}–E^{2}), musicians may tune the instrument either a semitone or a whole tone below or above the conventional pitch. Deviations exceeding a whole tone in either direction are rare. Pitch level may also depend on genre: in northern Transylvania, as well as in Oaș and Maramureș, for example, musicians deliberately tune the cetera lower for dances than for songs and doinas.

Beyond overall pitch adjustments, musicians make extensive use of scordatura – alterations of the intervallic relationships between strings. Scordatura serves several purposes: obtaining distinctive timbral effects (including those resulting from reduced string tension), imitating the sound of other instruments, facilitating the playing of double stops, and enabling performance in particular modal systems. Musicians themselves describe the process as "spoiling the tuning" (Romanian: stricarea drăsurii). Scordatura is most widespread in Oltenia (which accounts for more than half of the documented types) and Muntenia, is also encountered in Transylvania, and is considerably rarer in Moldavia and Bukovina. It is employed mainly by older and more experienced lăutari for the performance of archaic repertoire. Most commonly one or two strings are retuned, less frequently three, although tunings affecting all four strings are also documented. Researchers note that of the twenty-three scordatura types known in classical violin practice, professional lăutari employ eleven while adding twenty-six original variants developed within the lăutari tradition itself.

The first detailed information on Romanian lăutari scordatura dates to the mid‑19th century. The Romanian writer Nicolae Filimon noted in 1864 that for folk songs lăutari lower the E string by a whole tone, and he recorded old string names: rast (G), neva (D), saba (A), and neva again (E). These names derive from Eastern makam terminology, denoting key degrees. Ottoman music entered the professional lăutari milieu during the Phanariote period, when Eastern court culture strongly influenced urban music in the Romanian principalities. The use of the same name for two different strings is generally explained by the scordatura G–D^{1}–A^{1}–D^{2}, which reproduces the tuning of the Ottoman chest keman (Turkish: sînekemani).

Some characteristic melodic violin retunings include:

- "Straight tuning" (Romanian: dresura dreaptă, also cu subțirea jos or cu subțirea lăsată): the E^{2} string is lowered to D^{2}, producing the tuning G–D^{1}–A^{1}–D^{2}. It was used for a wide variety of dance melodies and was employed permanently by some older masters in the Târgoviște area (sometimes using a long silk thread as the highest string).
- Bagpipe imitation: the G string is lowered by a fourth to D, allowing the melody to be played primarily on the D^{1} string against a continuous drone on the lower string. The resulting tuning is D–D^{1}–A^{1}–E^{2}.
- "Overlaid strings" (Romanian: corzi încălecate): the A^{1} string is lowered to E^{1} and brought very close to the E^{2} string at the bridge, sometimes sharing the same groove. This enables parallel-octave performance and produces a timbre perceived by musicians as particularly "Eastern".
- Symmetric paired tuning (documented in Moldavia for Turceasca): D^{1} raised to G^{1}, A^{1} lowered to D^{1}, and E^{2} lowered to D^{2}, producing octave pairs G–G^{1} and D^{1}–D^{2}.
- "The clock" (Romanian: Ceasul): a scordatura used for clock-ticking imitation via pizzicato; The most common version lowers the E^{2} string to C♯^{2}, although more complex variants involving the retuning of three strings are also documented.

=== Tuning of accompanying violins ===
Unlike melodic violin scordatura, accompanying violins employ a permanent specialized tuning associated with their harmonic function. They typically have three strings and a flattened bridge enabling the bow to contact all strings and play full triads. Three principal tuning schemes are documented:

- Triad-based tuning: G–D^{1}–A (with A an octave below standard and placed between G and D^{1} in pitch).
- Drone-unison tuning: G–D^{1}–G (outer strings in unison).
- Mixed tuning: G–A–D^{1}.

== Playing technique and performance practices ==
=== Instrument and bow hold ===
Romanian lăutari employ violin techniques uncommon in academic schools. Instead of holding the instrument between the shoulder and chin, folk musicians support it primarily with the left hand: the neck rests deep in the palm, while the wrist is often bent inward and bears much of the instrument's weight. This posture keeps the player's chin free and allows the performer to sing or shout rhythmic calls to dancers (Romanian: strigături), but it significantly affects playing technique. Because the palm remains in close to the neck, strings are stopped not with the fingertips, but with the flatter surfaces of the finger pads. This produces the broad and relatively slow vibrato characteristic of many lăutari violinists. Since the left hand simultaneously supports the instrument, the rapid, noiseless position changes typical of academic technique become difficult. As a result, lăutari shift positions more slowly, and the transitions are clearly audible. These shifts are commonly shaped as expressive glissandos, one of the characteristic features of Romanian folk violin style.

Bow hold is less rigidly standardized than in academic practice and is often adapted to the requirements of particular repertories. Some violinists hold the bow not at the frog but several centimetres higher, believing that this facilitate short, energetic strokes in the middle part of the bow with less physical effort. Finger placement may also differ substantially from academic technique. Instead of balancing the bow with a curved little finger resting on the stick, many musicians place the little finger on top of the stick or allow it to hang over the side, in a manner resembling cello technique. Since off-the-string bowings such as spiccato are rare in folk performance, the balancing function of the little finger is less important. The resulting freer grip facilitates rapid detaché execution through active motion of the wrist and fingers.

=== Specific sound effects ===
For special timbral or imitative effects, lăutari employ a number of distinctive techniques, including the following:

- Spindle imitation: in Romanian: Fusul ("The spindle"), a horsehair taken from the bow is tied to the G or D string near the bridge. The performer rhythmically pulls the hair with rosin-coated fingers, causing the string to vibrate while the left hand simultaneously plays the melody.
- Use of a small glass (Romanian: păhărel): a small glass is placed on the soundboard so that it rests simultaneously against the upper part of the bridge and the tailpiece. The resulting vibration produces a nasal timbre used for comic effects, parodying church chant, or imitating other instruments.

== The violin in the taraf ==
In lăutărească music, the violin is the leading instrument of the taraf. (Note: With some exceptions, such as lăutari brass bands (Romanian: fanfare) in Moldavia.) In most regions the first violin (Romanian: primaș) serves as both principal performer and artistic leader of the ensemble. The primaș introduces melodies, performs preludes and interludes, improvises upon the basic melodic material, and in vocal genres often doubles or comments upon the singer's line. The remaining musicians – one or more second violins, viola, cobza, cimbalom, double bass, and later the accordion – provide harmonic and rhythmic support while following the musical direction established by the primaș.

Stable ensemble types developed across Romanian ethnographic regions. In Muntenia and Moldavia, the violin was traditionally accompanied by the cobza. In the mid‑19th century, Franz Liszt, comparing Moldavian and Wallachian practice with Hungarian, noted accompaniment of the violin melody by "…a continuously pedal bass…, invariably limited to the tonic…". From the late 19th century the cobza began to be displaced by the cimbalom; in the 20th century these in turn began to be displaced by the accordion. In northern Oltenia an accompanying instrument is a three- or four-string folk guitar tuned on the cobza principle (Romanian: chitară cobzită). In Maramureș, the cetera is accompanied by a differently tuned guitar known as the zongora.

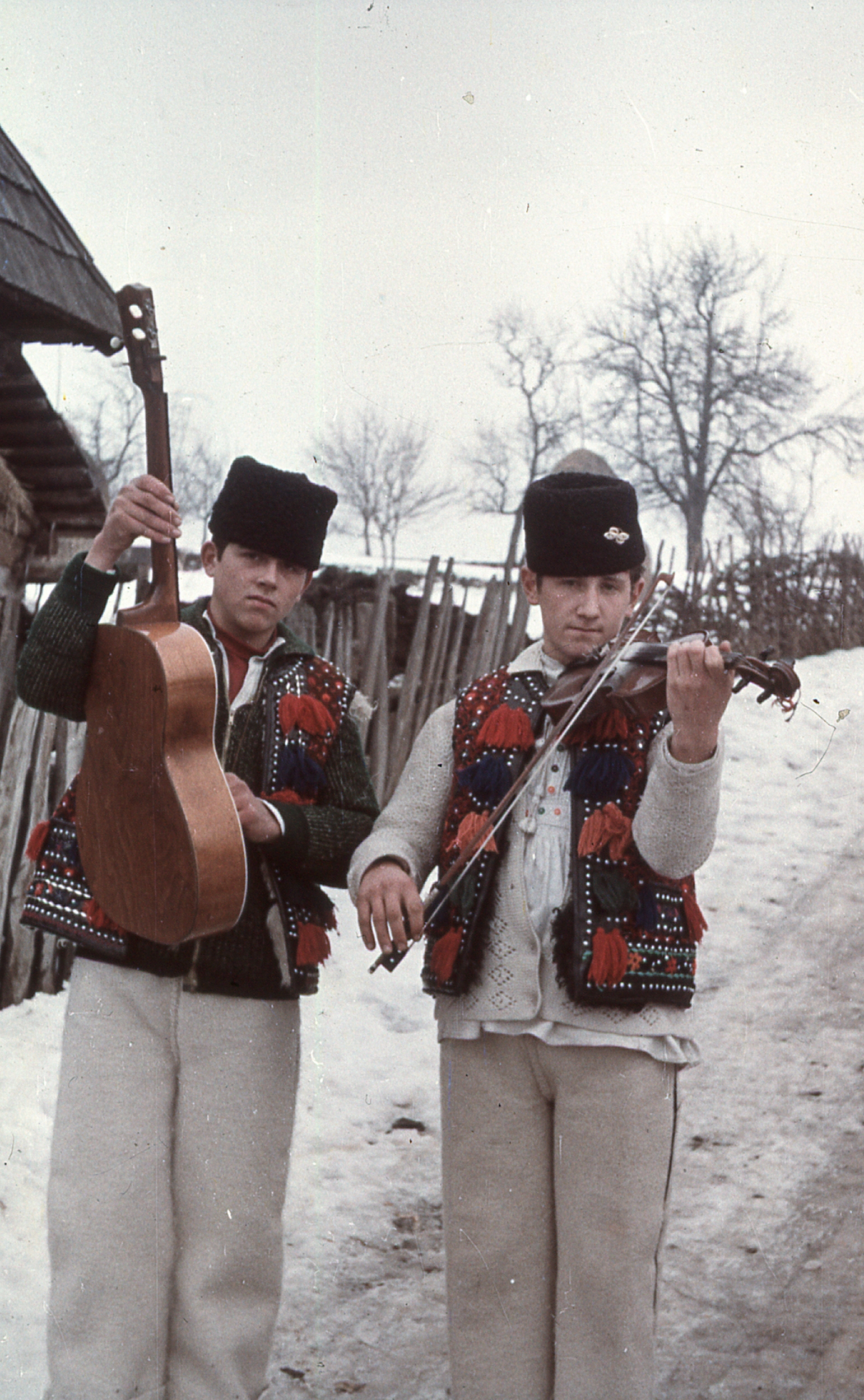
Cetera and zongora players in Maramureș, 1968

In Transylvania a clear division developed between melodic violins and rhythmic-harmonic ones (braci). The braci does not play the melody but provides chordal support; the primaș freely varies the melody while the accompaniment maintains ostinato formulas and only loosely aligns harmony with the melodic line. Because chord changes are not synchronized and parts may diverge, harsh sonorities arise; György Ligeti considered these "collisions" a natural result of the technique rather than mistakes. This accompaniment system influenced Bartók, who borrowed the principle of independent voice motion and superimposed rhythmic formulas generating dissonances outside classical harmony.

== Genres of violin music ==
The violin is one of the most versatile instruments in Romanian folklore and is used in nearly all genres – from improvisatory doinas to ritual cycles. In the epic ballad genre (Romanian: baladǎ or cântec bătrânesc), the violinist acts as a musical narrator. Performances typically begin with an improvisatory introduction – taksim (Romanian: taxîm) – that establishes the modal basis and emotional tone; the violin accompanies the voice and plays extended instrumental interludes, alternating recitative with virtuoso passages.

In the lyrical doina genre, the violin aims to imitate the human voice, using microchromatic inflections, glissando, and rich melismatic ornamentation. Its technical possibilities allow strong development of the vocal prototype, expanding range, complicating form, and saturating melody with ornaments.

From the mid‑19th century, dance music was performed predominantly by lăutari tarafs, with the violin in the leading role. Dance tunes make up a substantial part of folk violinists' repertoire; fieldwork in Muntenia suggests that a single village repertoire can include up to 50 dances.

The violin also plays an important role in ritual practice, accompanying many family and calendar rituals. Within the wedding cycle it accompanies the ritual shaving of the groom, the bride's farewell to the parental home, and the honoring of the wedding godparents; during festive gatherings violinists also perform music intended primarily "for listening" (Romanian: de ascultare). The violin provides the principal melodic and rhythmic framework for the male ritual dance căluș. In Muntenia, violinists may perform at funeral ceremonies for unmarried young people.

== Training ==
In lăutari communities, musical skills are transmitted orally, most often from father to son or from older to younger relatives. The age at which training begins is not strictly regulated: interest may appear at ages five to seven, while systematic instruction more commonly starts between ten and twelve years of age, and sometimes as late as fifteen to eighteen. Despite such comparatively late beginnings, students often attain a high technical level within only a few years. Instruction takes place without notation or theoretical manuals and is based primarily on direct imitation of the teacher.

Training unfolds in several stages. Initially, the child participates as a listener at rehearsals, family events, and feasts, gradually absorbing repertoire, rhythm, and performance conventions through observation of older musicians. After obtaining an instrument, the student begins reproducing simple melodies under supervision, focusing on the accurate imitation of intonation and ornamentation rather than on abstract technical exercises. An important stage is participation in a taraf during actual performances. At first, the teacher entrusts the student with relatively simple accompanying parts, fostering rhythmic discipline and ensemble coordination. Professional formation is considered complete when the musician acquires the ability to improvise and masters a substantial repertoire of dance, vocal, and ritual melodies. Evaluation of mastery depends not only on technical proficiency but also on the performer's ability to adapt music to the audience, occasion, and social setting.

== Traditional performers ==
Historical surveys, memoirs, and nineteenth-century publications preserve the names of a number of violinists through whom lăutari repertoire became known beyond local communities. For example, Nicolae Picu (1789–1864) is mentioned in an illustrated encyclopedia The Austro-Hungarian Monarchy in Word and Picture (1899) as the best lăutar of Bukovina; through him Romanian folk melodies became known to composers and musicians such as Franz Liszt and Karol Mikuli.

Teodor Burada retells a story published in the magazine La Vie Parisienne about a meeting in Iași between Franz Liszt and the head of the lăutari, Barbu Lăutaru. In January 1847, during a tour through Transylvania, Wallachia, and Moldavia, Liszt was invited, in Iași, to the home of a local boyar, where Barbu Lăutaru's taraf — consisting of violin, nai, and cobza — played for the guests. According to the account, Liszt was delighted by Barbu Lăutaru's playing, as well as by his ability to reproduce by ear, with precision, a piano piece that Liszt had just performed for him. Liszt himself mentions meetings with several lăutar tarafs in Bucharest and Iași, without naming them: "We found in them a fine vein of the great musical heritage" (French: ...nous avons retrouvé chez eux un beau filon de la grande veine musicale).

In Bessarabia – Chișinău and county centers – sources also mention virtuoso violinists: Iancu Perja (Chișinău), Lemiș (Bălți), Costache Parno (Bălți), and Gheorghe Murga, who led a large taraf in Dubăsari.

In the 20th century traditional violin performance increasingly entered the sphere of scholarly documentation through field expeditions, archives, and sound recordings. In 1928, Constantin Brăiloiu recorded performances by the Bukovinian violinist and taraf leader Sidor (Isidor) Andronicescu (1892–1981), preserving examples of regional repertoire and performance practice for later research. In the 1950s other performers also worked with the Institute of Ethnography and Folklore: Alexandru Cercel (1883–1970) recorded about 150 melodies in 1957, and Lache Găzaru (1912–1970) recorded more than 180 melodies, mainly old ballads.

From the second half of the 20th century, some lăutari violinists became better known through staged performances and record releases, often in collaboration with folklorists. Nicolae Neacșu (1924–2002) from Muntenia came to wider attention through the work of Speranța Rădulescu; he played with Taraful din Clejani and later Taraf de Haïdouks, and took part in projects with Yehudi Menuhin. The Romanian state label Electrecord issued recordings of Aurel Gore (1930–1989). Constantin Lupu (1951–2013), a violinist and folklorist from Botoșani (Moldavia), released an album on Ethnophonie, a label created by Speranța Rădulescu.

== Stage and concert performance ==
- Professional recordings
- Muntenia
- Oltenia
- Moldavia and Bukovina
- Maramureș
- Oaș
- Banat
- Bihor/Crișana
- Dobruja
- Bessarabia

In the 20th century one of the key figures in Romanian violin music was Grigoraș Dinicu (1889–1949), who combined folk and academic music traditions. A graduate of the Bucharest Conservatory, he maintained ties with lăutari circles while performing as a classical concert musician. Dinicu became known as the composer and performer of virtuosic pieces in folk style; his Hora staccato entered the international violin repertoire. Dinicu's influence is also noted in art-music composers and performers, including George Enescu, in whose works (for example, the Romanian Rhapsodies) intonational and rhythmic features of folk violin music are evident. Dinicu also produced a violin version of the tune Ciocârlia, whose authorship is attributed to his grandfather Angheluș Dinicu.

== Research and selected discography ==
The first attempt to study the Romanian folk violin was Teodor Burada's Originea violinei și perfecționarea ei ("The origin of the violin and its perfection", 1876). In the first half of the 20th century, violin music of Romanian lăutari was recorded and studied by Béla Bartók and Constantin Brăiloiu. Their collections are partly available online through ethnographic museums in Budapest and Geneva.

Electrecord: discography of folk violin music (as of 1978)
Region	Name	Electrecord catalogue no.
Banat	Moise Belmustață	45-EPC 10.405
Banat	Efta Botoca	EPD 1.288
Banat	Ion Luca Bănățeanu	EPD 1.175
Banat	Nelu Stan	EPC 01336
Banat	Ilie și Radu Vîncu	45-EPC 10.257
Bukovina	Alexandru Bidirei	STM-EPE 0933
Crișana	Petru Bundiș	EPC 10.125
Crișana	Ion Copil	EPD 1.089
Crișana	Gheorghe Rada	STM-EPE 01291
Oltenia	Florea Cioacă	EPC 559; EPC 986; STM-EPE 01326
Maramureș	Ștefan Petreuș	EPC 10.175; EPD 1.287; STM-EPE 0777; STM-EPE 01067
Moldavia	Mihai Botofei	STM-EPE 01101
Moldavia	Ion Drăgoi	EPC 781; EPC 10.173; STM-EPE 0776; STM-EPE 01396
Moldavia	Dumitru Potoroacă	45-EPC 10.233
Muntenia	Grigoraș Dinicu	EPD 1.063
Muntenia	Aurel Gore	EPC 10.028; 45-STM-EPC 10.505
Muntenia	Ion Matache	EPD 1.269
Muntenia	Florea Pascu	45-STM-EPC 10.559
Muntenia	Florea Voinicilă	45-EPC 10.487
Transylvania	Dumitru Cilică	45-EPC 10.565
Transylvania	Francisc Lakatoș	EPC 10.097
Transylvania	Victor Negrea	45-EPC 10.279
Transylvania	Alexandru Pintea	EPC 10.023
Transylvania	Ion Sabadîș	45-EPC 10.421
Transylvania	Alexandru Țitruș	STM-EPE 0887; STM-EPE 01262
Transylvania	Gheorghe Covaci-Cioată, Hendric Iorga, Gheorghe Rada, Ilie și Radu Vîncu	STM-EPE 0931

Tiberiu Alexandru wrote several major syntheses on the subject: the book Instrumentele muzicale ale poporului romîn ("Musical instruments of the Romanian people", 1956; section "Violin and viola"), the article Vioara ca instrument muzical popular ("The violin as a folk musical instrument", 1957), and an expanded republication in 1978. The book also contains transcriptions of violin pieces, and the 1978 article includes a list of solo recordings by violinists issued by Electrecord.

Speranța Rădulescu conducted field research documenting traditional musicians from different Romanian regions, supporting the preservation of disappearing styles and repertoires; many recordings were released on Electrecord, Smithsonian Folkways, and Ethnophonie.

== Contemporary status ==
In the postwar period in the Moldavian SSR, "concert tarafs" began to form for stage performance, in contrast to traditional lăutari tarafs tied to customs and rites. Such ensembles were often attached to state concert institutions; sizes ranged from 4–5 musicians to 7–10, with a leader typically playing violin or accordion. By the 1970s, concert taraf style became more eclectic and less connected with traditional lăutărească music; use of notation and arrangements limited improvisation. Their repertoire included arranged versions of instrumental and dance music, as well as folk songs.

Another form was the folk-music orchestra created in the 1960s–1970s within state concert institutions. Ensembles expanded to 15–25 musicians, a conductor role was fixed, and most performers had academic training; folklore was performed in arranged and stylized form, with rhythmic and structural features simplified and made more rigid.

In the same period, Romania also created large orchestras (up to 100 lăutari) on the Soviet model, including the Orchestra "Barbu Lăutaru" of the George Enescu State Philharmonic (founded 1949), featuring violinists such as Victor Predescu, Nicu Stănescu, and Ionel Budișteanu. These orchestras helped preserve some traditional instruments; at the same time, officially promoted music had reduced improvisational character, and regional distinctions were less prominent.

Alongside concert and orchestral forms, traditional lăutari tarafs also survived, with the violin retaining the leading function. In 2020 Romania nominated this ensemble tradition for inscription on UNESCO's Representative List of the Intangible Cultural Heritage of Humanity.

== Influence on professional music ==
The influence of Romanian lăutari violin tradition on 20th‑century classical music is traced, for example, in the work of George Enescu. It manifested less in direct borrowing of folk themes than as transfer of characteristic violin techniques and sound production into an academic context. A key example is his Violin Sonata No. 3, Op. 25 (dans le caractère populaire roumain). (Note: "In the Romanian folk character".) Enescu's pupil Yehudi Menuhin called this work "the greatest achievement of musical notation" he had encountered, emphasizing the difficulty of fixing in notation violin techniques and intonational nuances rooted in oral tradition. Analyses of archival recordings of Enescu himself show that the folk violin influence appears especially in glissando and portamento, flexible intonation, free rhythmic treatment, and attempts to go beyond notational constraints while preserving the sonata-cycle structure.

In the late 20th and early 21st centuries, elements of lăutari violin practice became a subject of scholarly and pedagogical literature. Several monographs and instructional manuals analyze lăutari technique – bowings, ornamentation, modal-intonational systems, and improvisation. These works address ethnomusicologists and musicians who use folk techniques in academic or cross-genre contexts and help transmit elements of oral tradition outside its natural context.

== See also ==
- Romanian traditional music

== Notes ==
Commentary

== Sources ==
- Carra, Jean-Louis (1781). Histoire de la Moldavie et la Valachie [History of Moldavia and Wallachia] (in French) (Nouvelle édition ed.). Neuchâtel: Société typographique de Neuchâtel.
- Stryjkowski, Maciej (1846). Kronika Polska, Litewska, Żmudzka i wszystkiej Rusi (1582) [Chronicle of Poland, Lithuania, Samogitia and all of Ruthenia] (in Polish) (3rd ed.). Warszawa.
- Wilkinson, William (1820). An Account of the Principalities of Wallachia and Moldavia. London: Longman.
- Liszt, Franz (1859). Des Bohémiens et de leur musique en Hongrie [Gypsies and their music in Hungary] (in French). Paris: Librairie Nouvelle.
- Karl (1874). "Vrais Tsiganes" [True Gypsies]. La Vie Parisienne (in French) (48). Paris: 673–674.
- Burada, Teodor T. (1876). "Originea violinei și perfecționarea ei" [The origin of the violin and its perfection]. Almanah Musical (in Romanian). II. Iași: 29–44.
- Burada, Teodor T. (1888). "Cronica muzicală a orașului Iași" [The musical chronicle of the city of Iași]. Convorbiri Literare (in Romanian). Iași: 1084–1087.
- Kronprinzen Rudolf; Weil von Weilen, Joseph, eds. (1899). Die österreichisch-ungarische Monarchie in Wort und Bild. Bukowina [The Austro-Hungarian Monarchy in words and pictures. Bukovina] (in German). Vol. 20. Wien: Die kaiserlich-königliche Hof- und Staatsdruckerei.
- Ligeti, György (1953). Szabolcsi, Bence; Bartha, Dénes (eds.). "Egy Aradmegyei román együttes" [A Romanian band from Arad County]. Emlékkönyv Kodály Zoltán 70. Születésnapjára (in Hungarian). Budapest: Akadémiai Kiadó: 399–404.
- Alexandru, Tiberiu (1956). Instrumentele muzicale ale poporului romîn [Musical instruments of the Romanian people] (in Romanian). București: Editura de stat pentru literatură și artă.
- Alexandru, Tiberiu (1957). "Vioara ca instrument muzical popular" [The violin as a folk musical instrument]. Revista de etnografie și folclor (in Romanian). II (3). București: 29–54.
- Ciobanu, Gheorghe (1969). Lăutarii din Clejani [Lăutari from Clejani] (in Romanian). București: Editura Muzicală.
- Georgescu, Florin (1970). "Despre unele aspecte inovatoare în practica muzicii populare instrumentale" [On some innovative aspects in the practice of instrumental folk music]. Revista de etnografie și folclor (in Romanian). 15 (3). București: 197–216.
- Alexandru, Tiberiu (1975). Muzica populară românească [Romanian folk music] (in Romanian). București: Editura Muzicală.
- Alexandru, Tiberiu (1978). "Vioara ca instrument muzical popular". Folcloristică. Organologie. Muzicologie. Studii [The violin as a folk musical instrument] (in Romanian). Vol. 1. București: Editura Muzicală. pp. 197–238.
- Garfias, Robert (1981). "Survivals of Turkish Characteristics in Romanian Musica Lautareasca". Yearbook for Traditional Music. 13. International Council for Traditional Music: 97–107. doi:10.2307/768360. JSTOR 768360.
- Rădulescu, Speranța (1988). "La formation du lǎutar roumain" [The formation of Romanian lǎutari]. Cahiers de musiques traditionnelles (in French). 1. Ateliers d'ethnomusicologie: 87–99. doi:10.2307/40240012. JSTOR 40240012.
- Miller, Miamon (1990). How To Play Romanian Folk Violin. Santa Monica, CA: Fuge Imaginea Press.
- Cosma, Viorel (1996). Lăutarii de ieri și de azi [Lăutari of yesterday and today]. Colecția Destine (in Romanian) (2nd ed.). București: Ed. DU Style. ISBN 978-973-9246-05-7.
- Miller, Miamon; Cercel, Lache (1997). How To Play Romanian Folk Violin. Vol. 2. Santa Monica, CA: Fuge Imaginea Press.
- Sadie, Stanley; Tyrrell, John, eds. (2001). "Romania, III. Traditional music". The New Grove Dictionary of Music and Musicians. Vol. 21 (2nd ed.). New York: Oxford University Press. ISBN 978-0-19-517067-2.
- Lupu, Constantin (2004). Muzică veche din Moldova de Sus (CD booklet). Ethnophonie. CD 009. Archived from the original on 2025-04-20.
- Bouët, Jacques; Lortat-Jacob, Bernard; Rǎdulescu, Speranța (2002). À tue-tête: Chant et violon au Pays de l'Oach, Roumanie [At the top of your lungs: Song and violin in the Land of Oaș, Romania] (in French). Nanterre: Société d'Ethnologie. ISBN 2-901161-66-9.
- Filimon, Nicolae (2008). Pașca, Eugenia Maria; Ionescu, Vasile (eds.). "Lăutarii și compozițiunile lor (1864)" [Lăutari and their compositions]. Rromii în muzica românească. Antologie de texte și sinteze (in Romanian). Iași: Artes: 125–128. ISBN 978-973-8263-22-2.
- Lupașcu, Marian (2008). "Ipostaze ale unei personalități – Lache Găzaru" [Poses of a personality – Lache Găzaru]. Anuarul Institutului de etnografie și folclor, serie nouă (in Romanian). 19: 177–186.
- Chiseliță, Vasile (2009). "Fenomenul lăutăriei și tradiția instrumentală" [The lăutari phenomenon and the instrumental tradition]. Arta muzicală a Moldovei. Istorie și modernitate (in Romanian). Chișinău: Grafema Libris: 73–99. ISBN 978-9975-52-046-1.
- Libin, Laurence, ed. (2014a). The Grove Dictionary of Musical Instruments. Vol. 3 (Iamba malebe – Ožragis) (2nd ed.). New York: Oxford University Press. ISBN 978-0-19-935032-2.
- Libin, Laurence, ed. (2014b). The Grove Dictionary of Musical Instruments. Vol. 5 (Tibia – Zygmuntowicz, Samuel) (2nd ed.). New York: Oxford University Press. ISBN 978-0-19-935034-6.
- Sarău, Gheorghe (2016). Floarea rromă; I rromani luludǐ [RRoma flower] (in Romanian). București: Vanemonde. ISBN 978-973-1733-56-2.
- Trillo, Roberto Alonso (2018). "Enescu Performs Enescu: Glissandi in the Sonata op. 25 (dans le caractère populaire roumain)". International Review of the Aesthetics and Sociology of Music. 49: 115–135. ISSN 0351-5796.
- Setaro, Essena L. (2018). Solo Violin Works Influenced by Romanian Lăutari Music (PhD dissertation). University of South Carolina.
- Rădulescu, Speranța (2020). Sandu-Dediu, Valentina; Gheorghiță, Nicolae (eds.). Prefacerea muzicilor orale de-a lungul secolului XX [Transformation of Oral Musical Traditions Across the 20th Century] (in Romanian). Vol. I. De la vechi manuscrise la perioada modernă a muzicii românești. București: Editura Muzicală. pp. 171–218. ISBN 978-973-42-1155-5.
- Pávai, István (2020). Hungarian Folk Dance Music of Transylvania. Budapest: MMA Kiadó.
- Beissinger, Margaret H. (2023). "Ultimele cântece bătrânești din Olt / Last Old Songs From Olt. Review". Music & Minorities. 17 (2): 1–7. doi:10.52413/mm.2023.17. ISSN 2791-4569.

== External sources ==
- Bartók, Béla. "Collections at the Museum of Ethnography. Romanian units". bartok.neprajz.hu. Museum of Ethnography. Archived from the original on 2025-04-27.
- Brăiloiu, Constantin. "Collection universelle de musique populaire" [Universal collection of folk music]. Musée d'ethnographie de Genève (in French). Archived from the original on 2024-09-11.
- "Sînekemani". Turkish Music Portal. Archived from the original on 2025-05-22.
- Grigorescu, Denis (2017). "Alexandru Cercel, povestea unui rapsod care a luptat în Primul Război Mondial" [Alexandru Cercel, the story of a rhapsode who fought in World War I]. adevarul.ro (in Romanian). Archived from the original on 2024-12-29.
- "Nicolae Neacsu: Romanian Gypsy violinist who conquered the west". The Guardian. Archived from the original on 2025-09-11.
- "The Traditional Folk Music Band". sperantaradulescu.ro. Archived from the original on 2025-11-17.
- "Romania: Festive Music from the Maramures Region". Smithsonian Folkways. Archived from the original on 2024-12-19.
- Azamfirei, Mirel (2022). "Folcloristul, dirijorul și violonistul Constantin Lupu (1951–2013)" [Folklorist, conductor and violinist Constantin Lupu (1951–2013)]. centrulcreatieibt.ro (in Romanian). Archived from the original on 2025-10-16.
- "Traditional music band from Romania". UNESCO. 2020. Archived from the original on 2024-09-12.
