= Nicolae Neacșu =

Romanian musician

- Born: 1924; Isaccea, Tulcea
- Origin: Clejani, Romania
- Died: September 2002 (aged 77–78) Clejani, Giurgiu
- Genre: lăutărească music
- Occupations: Lăutar, violinist
- Instrument: Romanian folk violin
- Formerly of: Taraf de Haïdouks

Nicolae Neacșu (1924 – 3 September 2002) was a Romanian lăutar and former member of the Clejani-based band Taraf de Haïdouks. He was considered to be one of the best Romani violinists in the world. His main disciple was Gheorghe "Caliu" Anghel, who still plays in the Taraf de Haïdouks.
