= Petko Staynov =

Bulgarian composer and pianist (1896–1977)

- Пeтко Стайнов
- Born: 1 December 1896; Kazanlak, Bulgaria
- Died: 25 June 1977 (aged 80); Sofia, Bulgaria
- Resting place: Central Sofia Cemetery
- Occupation: Composer
- Website: staynov.org/en/

Petko Staynov (Bulgarian: Петко Стайнов; December 1, 1896 – June 25, 1977) was a Bulgarian composer and pianist. He enriched the Bulgarian musical culture and contributed considerably to its development. A composer of great creative talent, of wide musical and general culture, possessing a keen sense for the topical ideas of modern time, he dedicated his entire life and all his abilities to Bulgarian music and musical culture, and to the Bulgarian Academy of Sciences.

== Life ==
At the age of six Staynov injured one of his eyes; as a result, the other eye was also infected. At 11, he lost his sight completely. He graduated from the Institute for the Blind in Sofia (1915), where his talent for music showed for the first time. Later he studied music with Andrei Stoyanov and made his initial attempts at composing. In 1920 he left for Germany for a year of studies at the Private Musical Lyceum in Braunschweig. In 1923 he graduated from the Dresden Musical Conservatory, majoring in composition under Alexander Wolf and in piano under Ernst Munch. Having returned to Kazanluk in 1925, he created his first major work: the Thracian Dances symphonic suite in three movements. He later added an additional movement to the suite, Mechkarsko (The Bear Warder's Dance, 1926).

In 1927 he moved to Sofia and began teaching piano at the Institute for the Blind. Petko Staynov worked mainly in the genres of symphonic and choral music. Being equally talented in both, he generalised some trends in Bulgarian musical creativity and opened new vistas to its development. He adapted the European musical tradition to the Bulgarian way of thinking, to the abilities of both performers and listeners, to the natural process of advancement of the national music. From European music Staynov adopted some expressive devices and forms, the resources of the symphony orchestra, the construction of a well-engineered structure. What characterises him as a markedly Bulgarian musical creative artist is the introduction of a Bulgarian musical style of his own. This style was expressed to its fullest in the completely independent melody (without direct quoting of folk music) and in the harmonic language of his work. The idea of his compositions is clarified through the lyrics of his choral songs and ballads and through the programmatic titles of most of his symphonic works.

== Works ==
Staynov's symphonic output includes the suites Thracian Dances (1925, 1926) and A Fairy Tale (1930), the symphonic poems A Legend (1927) and Thrace (1937), Symphonic Scherzo (1930), the concert overtures Balkan and Youth Overture (1936 and 1953), two symphonies (1945 and 1949). They reveal the beauty of his native land, the fervour of folk dances, and evoke fairy-tale images. His two symphonies are marked by deeply felt philosophic generalisations.

Staynov's symphonic works breathe powerful philosophic suggestions, while some of them, like, for example, Thracian Dances and Thrace, have become symbolic for Bulgarian music. Petko Staynov's choral songs reveal features of the Bulgarian people's character (A Fir Tree Is Bending; A Bright Sun Has Risen; Hey, Ivan; Play a Tune, Dimo; Oh, That Man Dimo; Hey, Dimo). Till the early 1930s, he followed the traditions of choral art laid by the first composers in the genre, introducing at the same time elements of his own style.

With his choral ballads Staynov laid the foundation of a whole new field in Bulgarian music. In them he recreated mainly dramatic events from Bulgaria's older and new history and thus achieved a national ballad sound (e.g. The Secret of Struma River, 1931; Urvich for mixed choir on lyrics by N. Rakitin, 1933; Horsemen, 1932; One Hundred and Twenty Men for male choir on lyrics by P.P. Slaveykov, 1935; A Maiden's Lament for mixed choir on lyrics by T. Kunev. 1936; Comrade Anton for mixed choir on lyrics by I. Radoev, 1954; Godfather German for mixed choir on lyrics by D. Panteleev, 1955). For his ballads, the composer employed elements from the national intonation fund, but the strictly folk sounding would have impeded his creative fervour in achieving effective dramatic narration. Staynov's ballads pose technical difficulties to their performers and have remained to the present day a touchstone for the performing mastery of Bulgarian choirs.

His overall work in both the symphonic and the choral genres contributed to some neglected stages in the development of Bulgarian music and thus further established his status as an outstanding figure in Bulgarian musical culture.

== Public offices ==
Petko Staynov held the chair of the Union of Folk Choirs in Bulgaria (the Bulgarian Singing Union) and of the Contemporary Music Association of Bulgarian Composers (1933–44), and served as Director of the National Opera (1941–44). In 1941 he was elected Regular Member (Academician) of the Bulgarian Academy of Sciences and in 1948 he became Director of the newly founded Institute for Music with Museum (later Institute of Musicology) with the Academy; held this position to the end of his days. He was also member of the Presidium of the Bulgarian Academy of Sciences. Academician-Secretary of the Department of Arts and Culture at the Bulgarian Academy of Sciences was among the other positions he held. Under his wise and competent direction, these institutions, unions, associations and other organizations reached the highest levels of their achievements.

In 1965, he founded National Festival of Bulgarian Folk Art with Rayna Katsarova and Anna Kamenova.

Petko Staynov's ideas about the social functions of music, about the significance of folk music for the creativity of Bulgarian composers, about the creation of a Bulgarian musical style, choral singing, choirs, school musical education, composers and their works, performers and events in the country's musical life were laid down in numerous articles, most of which were published in the collection Petko Staynov: On Bulgarian Musical Culture, 1967.

Petko Staynov held numerous high state awards. He died on June 25, 1977.

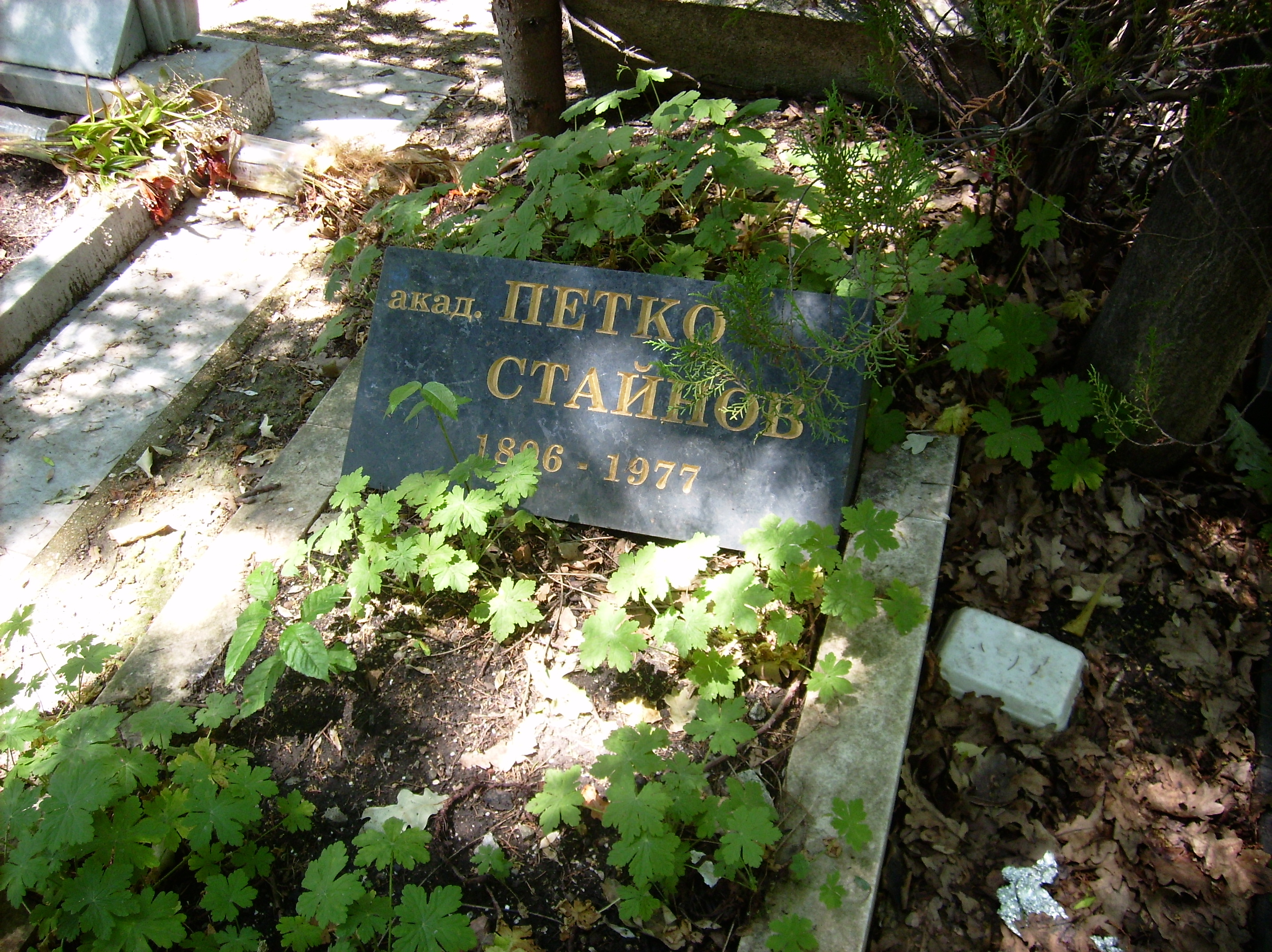
Petko Staynov's grave in Central Sofia Cemetery
