= Kozioł (bagpipe) =

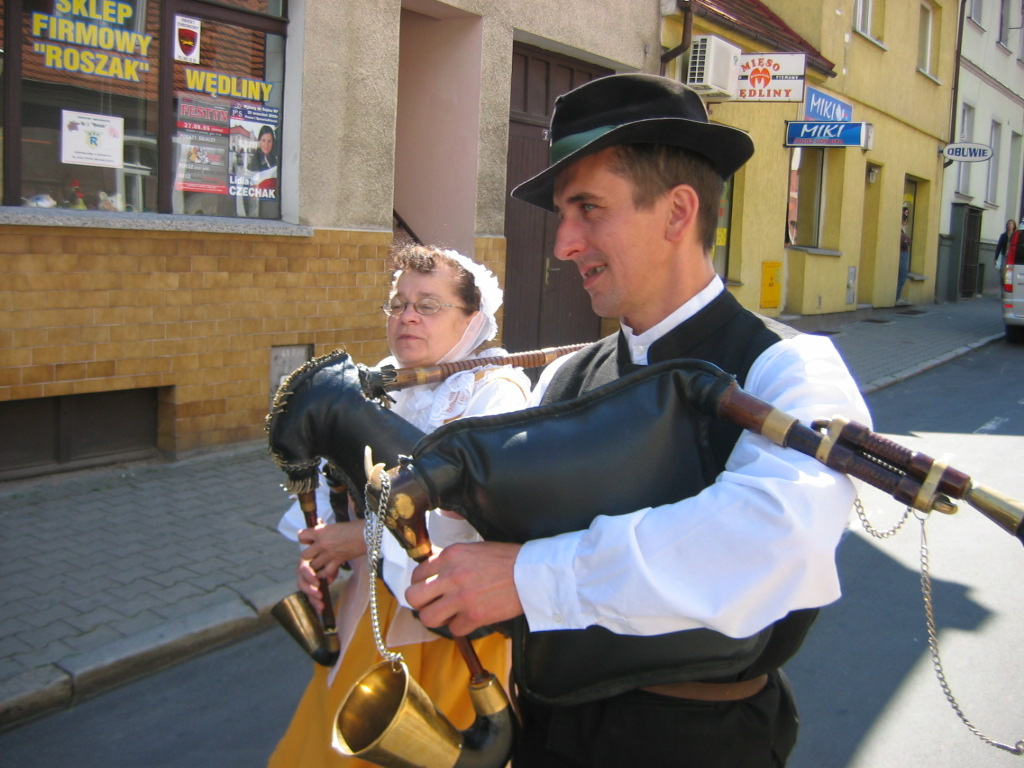
Two Polish pipers, with the woman playing the kozioł czarny.

Kozioł (English: Goat) refers to several variants of bagpipes native to a region of Poland surrounding the city of Zbąszyń.

== Kozioł biały ==
The kozioł biały (or kozioł weselny) features a drone with a projecting horn, and is inflated with bellows rather than the mouth. The name (literally "white goat") comes from the use of a hair-out goat's hide for the pipebag, and this is often complemented by a carved wooden goat's head ornamenting the stock of the chanter.

The instrument was widely popular in Poland historically, and was even played in the court of King Christian IV.

== Kozioł czarny ==
The kozioł czarny ("black goat") is also known as kozioł ślubny ("wedding goat"), in reference to the place where it is commonly played. Like the kozioł biały it is also bellows-blown and has a single drone with a projecting horn. However, it is made from the hide of a black-haired goat, and is also smaller than the kozioł biały.

One of the few remaining kozioł pipemakers, Marek Modrzyk, lives in the village of Nądnia.
