= Clejani =

- Commune
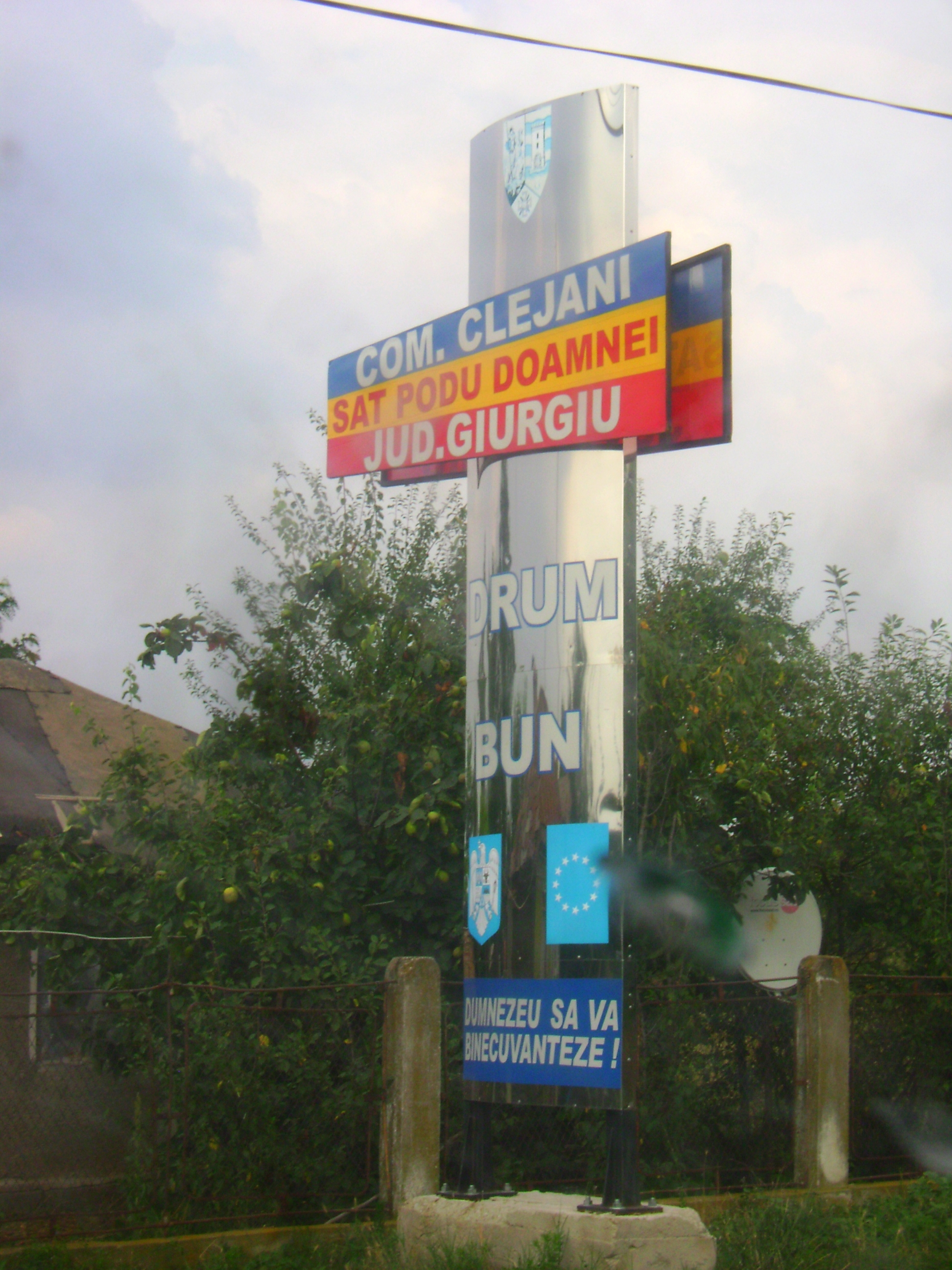
- Welcome sign at the commune entry

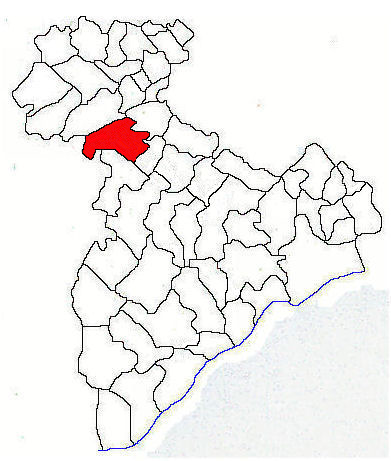
- Location in Giurgiu County

- Location in Romania
- Coordinates: 44°19′N 25°42′E
- Country: Romania
- County: Giurgiu

Government
  - Mayor (2020–2024): Florin Nidelea (PNL)
- Elevation: 80 m (260 ft)
- Population (2021-12-01): 3,503
- Time zone: UTC+02:00 (EET)
  - Summer (DST): UTC+03:00 (EEST)
- Postal code: 087045
- Area code: +(40) 246
- Vehicle reg.: GR

Clejani is a commune in Giurgiu County, Muntenia, Romania, about 40 km south of Bucharest, in the Vlașca region (part of Muntenia), on the Danube Plains near the Bulgarian border. It is composed of four villages: Clejani, Neajlovu, Podu Doamnei, and Sterea.

The commune is famous for its lăutari or Romani musicians, especially the group Taraful Haiducilor (a.k.a. Taraf de Haïdouks). Members of the group Mahala Rai Banda also trace their roots to Clejani.

Historical population
| Year | Pop. | ±% |
|---|---|---|
| 2002 | 3,448 | — |
| 2011 | 3,809 | +10.5% |
| 2021 | 3,503 | −8.0% |
Source: Census data
