= Taraf de Haïdouks =

Romanian-Romani taraf

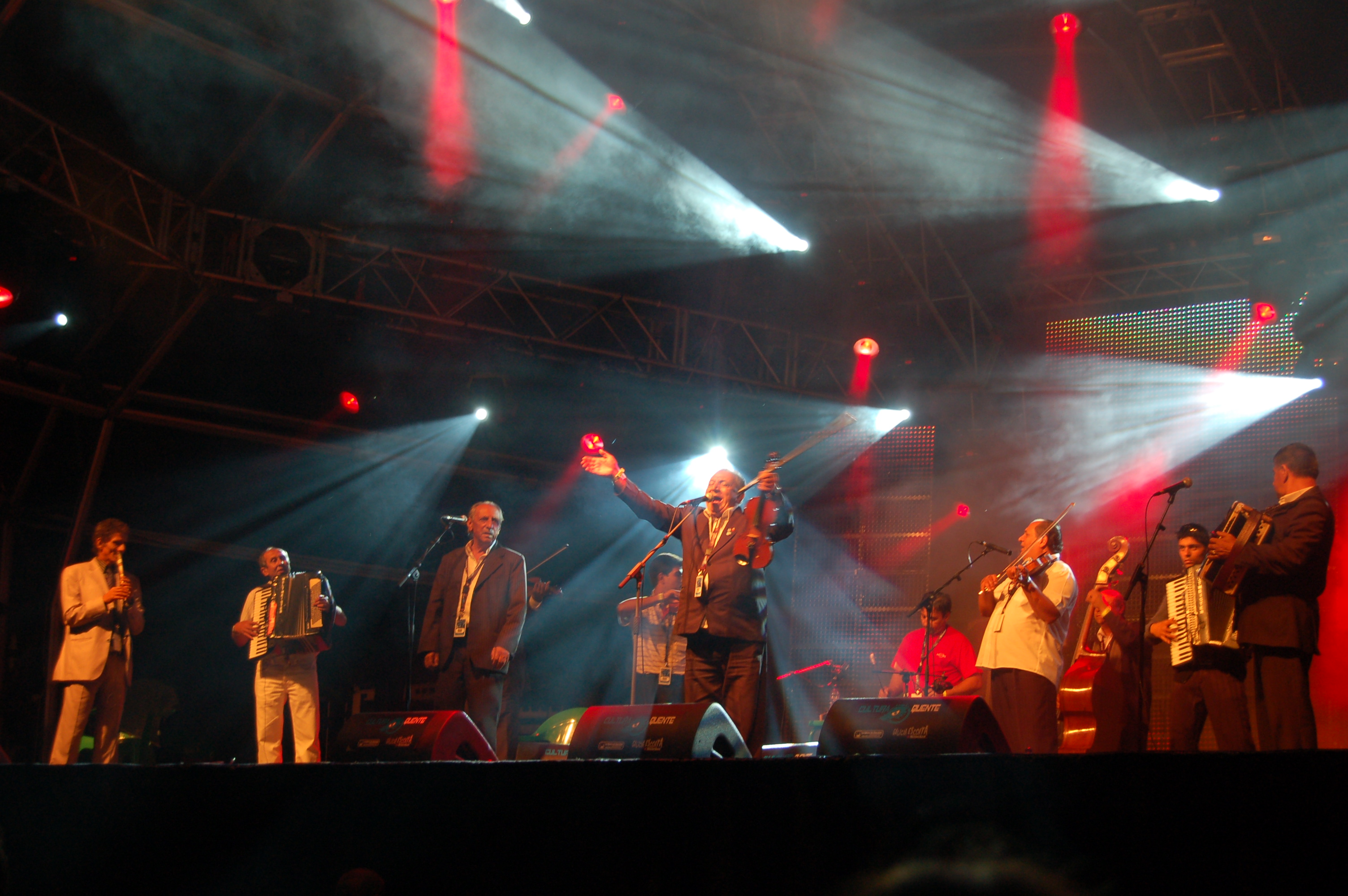
- Taraf de Haïdouks in 2008

Background information
- Origin: Clejani, Romania
- Genres: Lăutărească music, Popular music
- Label: Crammed Discs

Taraful Haiducilor ("Taraf of Haiduks") are a Romanian-Romani taraf (a troupe of lăutari, traditional musicians) from Clejani, Romania, and one of the most prominent such groups in post-Communist era Romania. In the Western world they have become known by the name given to them in French-speaking areas, where they are known as Taraf de Haïdouks.

== History ==
The lăutari originating in the village of Clejani have long been known for their musical skills. The first recordings by ethnomusicologists in the village were made in the interwar period. Speranța Rădulescu, a Romanian folklorist also made recordings in Clejani in 1983 for the archive of the Romanian Bucharest-based Institute for Ethnography and Folklore of the Romanian Academy. The recordings were made in various configurations. During the Communist era, many lăutari from Clejani were also employed in the national ensembles that played Romanian popular music.

Early contacts in the West included Swiss ethnomusicologist Laurent Aubert and Belgian musicians Stéphane Karo and Michel Winter, two fans who were so taken by the band's music that they turned into managers, brought the newly named "Taraf de Haïdouks" to Western Europe and helped launch their international career.

Since the release of its first album in 1991, Taraf de Haïdouks has been considered the epitome of Romany music's vitality. Their polyphonic sound incorporates instruments such as the violin, double drum, accordion, flute, cimbalom, double bass and some wind instruments. The group has toured worldwide, released acclaimed albums and a DVD (see below), and counts among its fans the late Yehudi Menuhin, the Kronos Quartet (with whom it has recorded and performed), actor Johnny Depp (alongside whom the group appeared in the film The Man Who Cried), fashion designer Yohji Yamamoto (who invited the band to be models-cum-musicians for his Paris and Tokyo shows), composer Danny Elfman (who hired them to play for his 50th birthday party), and many more. Meanwhile, the band members seem to have been relatively unaffected by all this, maintaining their way of life (they still reside in Clejani, in the Wallachian countryside).

In 2007, the band released their album Maskarada, in which they reinterpret and "re-gypsify" pieces by 20th-century classical composers (such as Bartók, Khachaturian and Kodály) who drew inspiration from national folklore and often borrowed from Roma styles.

== Members ==
Some of the core members of the group:

- Nicolae Neacșu ("Culai"): violin, vocals; born 1924; died September 2002 (age 78)
- Dumitru Baicu ("Cacurică"): cimbalom, vocals; born 1931; died September 2007 (age 76)
- Ilie Iorga: vocals; actually from Mârșă, near Clejani; born 1928; died June 2012 (age 84)
- Ion Manole ("Șaică" or "Boșorogu"): violin, vocals; born 1920; died May 2002 (age 82)
- Gheorghe Anghel ("Caliu"): violin
- Gheorghe Fălcaru ("Fluierici"): flute, double bass; born 1954; died September 2016 (age 62)
- Ionică Tănase: cimbalom
- Constantin Sandu ("Dinu"): cimbalom, vocals
- Florea Pârvan: double bass
- Marin Sandu ("Țagoe"): accordion
- Paul Guiclea ("Pașalan"): voice, violin; born 28 January 1932; died 13 September 2018 (age 86)
- Marin Manole ("Marius"): accordion
- Constantin Lăutaru ("Costică Boieru"): violin, voice; born 26 September 1956; died 7 December 2021 (age 65)
- Viorel Vlad: double bass
- Robert Gheorghe: violin

== Discography ==
=== Commercially released ===
- Musique des Tziganes de Roumanie (Crammed Discs, 1991)
- Honourable Brigands, Magic Horses and Evil Eye (Crammed Discs, 1994)
- Dumbala Dumba (Crammed Discs, 1998)
- Taraf de Haïdouks (compilation released on Nonesuch Records, 1999)
- Band of Gypsies (Crammed Discs, 2001)
- The Continuing Adventures of Taraf de Haïdouks – Live at Union Chapel (CD+DVD, Crammed Discs, 2006)
- Maškaradă (Crammed Discs, 2007)
- Band of Gypsies 2, with Kočani Orkestar (Crammed Discs, 2011)
- Of Lovers, Gamblers and Parachute Skirts (Crammed Discs, 2015)

=== Non-commercially released ===
Before the Haïdouks organized themselves as a group, many of them were recorded on an ethnomusicological album:

- Musique des Tsiganes de Valachie; les lăutari de Clejani (1988) [OCORA 3149025011190]

The following albums were produced by Fundaţia Alexandru Tzigara-Samurcas in Bucharest, in association with Euroart, the cultural fund of the Department for European Integration of the Ministry of Culture and Religious Affairs of Romania.

- The End of the Millenium [sic] in the Romanian Village / Fin de Millénaire dans le Village Roumain / Sfârșit de mileniu în satul Românesc, a collection of recordings from 1989–97, released in 2000, with liner notes in English, French, and Romanian. Only some of the musicians on these recordings are affiliated with the taraf, but several, some from other villages, have toured with them.
- Outlaws of Yore / Les 'Haïdouks' d'Autrefois, two volumes (labeled "I" and "II"), recorded at the Museum of the Romanian Peasant, Bucharest, March 1991, released in 2001, with liner notes in English and French.

=== Contributing artist ===
- The Rough Guide to the Music of Eastern Europe (1999, World Music Network)

== Film ==
Two performances by the group featured in the 1993 French film Latcho Drom by Tony Gatlif. In 2001 the Taraf appeared in Sally Potter's film The Man Who Cried alongside friend and fan Johnny Depp, Christina Ricci, Cate Blanchett and John Turturro. They were one of the five Romani bands to feature in the movie When the Road Bends… Tales of a Gypsy Caravan (2006).

== Bibliography ==
- Hopa, tropa, Europa (Hop, trot, Europe) by Speranţa Rădulescu (Museum of the Romanian Peasant, 1992) describes the group's first European tour.
- Liner notes of Outlaws of Yore
