= Rayna Katsarova =

Bulgarian ethnomusicologist (1901–1984)

- Born: 7 May 1901; Sofia, Bulgaria
- Died: 14 September 1984 (aged 83)

Rayna Katsarova (7 May 1901 – 14 September 1984) was a Bulgarian ethnomusicologist, manager of cultural institutions and one of the founders of the International Council for Traditional Music.

== Life ==
Rayna Katsarova was born in Sofia on 7 May 1901. In 1925 she graduated from the Music Academy in Sofia, and in 1931 she studied in Berlin with Erich Moritz von Hornbostel and Robert Lachmann. She worked in the folk music section of the Ethnographic Museum in Sofia, first as assistant keeper from 1934 to 1937, and then as senior keeper and Head from 1947 to 1952.

In 1947 she was among the founders of the International Council for Traditional Music. From 1952 to 1962 she was the director of the Institute of Musicology of the Bulgarian Academy of Sciences. From 1965 she was a member of the Societé Internationale d'Ethnologie et de Folklore. She was the founder of the dance archive of the Institute of Musicology. Her students included Stoyan Dzhudzhev, Nikolai Kaufman, and Todor Todorov. In 1965, she founded the National Festival of Bulgarian Folk Art with Petko Staynov and Anna Kamenova.

She died on 14 September 1984.

== Selected publications ==
- Dances of Bulgaria (1951)
- Błogarskije narodnyje tancy (1958)
- Le manque de coïncidences entre la figure chorégraphique et la phrase mélodique (1960)
- L'ethnomusicologie et Bulgarie de 1954 à nos jours (1960)
- La classification des mélodies en Bulgarie (1965)
