= Teodor Burada =

Romanian ethnographer and musicologist (1839–1923)

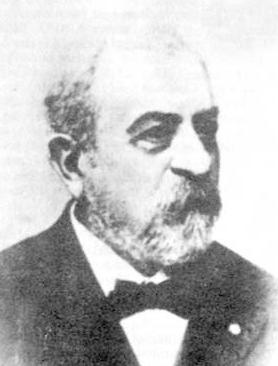
- Born: Teodor T. Burada'; 3 October 1839; Iași, Moldavia
- Died: 17 February 1923 (aged 83); Iași, Kingdom of Romania

Academic background
- Education: Conservatoire de Paris, 1865

Academic work
- Discipline: Folklore studies; ethnography; musicology
- Institutions: Iaşi Conservatory
- Musical career
- Instrument: Violin

Teodor T. Burada (3 October 1839 – 17 February 1923) was a Romanian academic, writer, folklorist, ethnographer, musicologist and violinist.

== Biography ==
Burada was born on 3 October 1839 in Iași, Moldavia (present-day Romania). From 1855 and 1860 Burada studied music in Iași, before becoming was a professor of violin at the Iaşi Conservatory from 1860 to 1861. Resuming his studies, Burada attended the Conservatoire de Paris from 1861 to 1865.

In 1878, Burada was the first musician to become a member of the Romanian Academy. In 1884 he unearthed fragments of pottery and terracotta figurines near the village of Cucuteni, Iași County, which led to the discovery of the Cucuteni-Trypillian culture, a major Neolithic archaeological culture. From 1893 to 1903, Burada was a professor of music theory at Iaşi Conservatory.

He traveled widely in Eastern Europe on concert tours, and took the opportunity in his travels to collect folklore material, especially among Romanian communities. His publications include material on music education and many other musical topics. He was the editor of Dicţionar muzical (c. 1862–75), the earliest Romanian dictionary of music.

On 17 February 1923, Burada died in Iași aged 83.
