= List of bagpipe makers =

This is a list of bagpipe makers. It covers both family-based and commercial outfits from the 17th century to the present era. In the 1950s, the bagpipe traditions of Europe were revived. The market is increasing in size as the popularity of the instrument is increasing, and the list of bagpipe makers is rising.

== British Isles pipes ==
=== Great Highland Bagpipes/Great Irish Warpipes ===
Firm	Name	Location	Apprenticed	Retired	Notes	Refs
Unknown	James Ramsay Oswald	Melbourne, Victoria, Australia	1941	2003	One of only ten bagpipe makers in Australia.	
Dunbar Bagpipe Maker Ltd.	Rick Pettigrew, Barry Dunbar, Jacquie Dunbar	St. Catharines, Ontario, Canada			Founded by Jack Dunbar of Glasgow in 1985	
John Walsh Bagpipes Ltd.	John Walsh, Tom MacMillan	Antigonish, Nova Scotia, Canada				
The Burley Bagpipes Company	Graham Burley	Naramata, British Columbia, Canada				
Lee & Sons Bagpipes	Jack Lee, Andrew Lee	Surrey, British Columbia, Canada				
Macbeth and Co. Bagpipes	Martin MacBeth	Brisbane, Australia	1990s		Began in Brisbane 2010?	
Fisher Bagpipes	Wayne Fisher	Sarnia, Ontario, Canada			Self-taught pipemaker. One of only a handful of bagpipe makers in Canada.	
American Bagpipe Makers Inc.	Charles E. Kron	Dobbs Ferry, New York, US	1987?			
Rolf of Sweden	Rolf Littorin	Sweden	1990s		Custom made bagpipes: Great Highland Bagpipes, Smallpipes, Practice Chanters. Self-taught pipe maker.	
William Sinclair and Son	William M. Sinclair	Edinburgh, Scotland	1926			
MacLellan Bagpipes	Roddy MacLellan	Zebulon, North Carolina, US	1988		Zebulon location began operations in 2023. The only business in North America to make, sell, and teach how to play bagpipes.	
McCallum Bagpipes Ltd.		Kilmarnock, Scotland				
O'Mahony Warpipes	James O'Mahony	Cork, Ireland	1914?		From Mitchelstown in Cork. Maker of Fiddles and Warpipes.	
O'Keeffe Warpipes	O'Keeffe	Tippperary, Ireland	1910		Is said to have been one of the first makers of Warpipes in Ireland in the 20th century. Prior to that Warpipes weren't known to have been made since 1870.	
O'Crowley Music	Tadhg & Denis Crowley	Cork, Ireland	1920	1952 1966	Brother's Tadhg and Denis Crowley made Warpipes, Highland Pipes, and Uilleann pipes in Cork.	
David Naill & Co., Ltd.	Leslie Cowell	Somerset, England			Founded 1976. Makers of Scottish Bagpipes, Smallpipes & chanters.	
Peter Henderson Ltd.	Peter Henderson	Glasgow, Scotland	1868	1972	One of the famous Scottish bagpipe makers. Merged with R. G. Hardie & Co. in 1972.	
R. G. Hardie & Co.	Robert G. Hardie	Glasgow, Scotland	1950			

=== Uilleann pipes ===
Firm	Name	Location	Apprenticed	Retired	Notes	Refs
Unknown	William Taylor	Philadelphia, PA	1840-1872	1901		
The Burley Bagpipes Company	Graham Burley	Naramata, British Columbia, Canada				
Unknown	Charles Taylor	Philadelphia, PA	1840-1872	1902		
	Patrick A. Brown	Boston, Massachusetts	1910	1958		
	Leo Rowsome					
	Bruce Childress	Maine				

=== Scottish smallpipes and borderpipes ===
Firm	Name	Location	Apprenticed	Retired	Notes	Refs
Fisher Bagpipes	Wayne Fisher	Sarnia, ON			Self-taught pipemaker.	
	Hamish Moore	Dunkeld		X		
	Fin Moore	Dunkeld			Smallpipes, Borderpipes and Bagpipes	
Fred Morrison Smallpipes					Smallpipes and Borderpipes manufactured by McCallum Bagpipes Ltd	
The Burley Bagpipes Company	Graham Burley	Naramata, British Columbia, Canada				
John Walsh Bagpipes Ltd.	John Walsh	Antigonish, NS			Smallpipes, Great Highland Pipes, and Shuttlepipes.	
Iona Bagpipes	Bill Hart	Sydney, Australia			Smallpipes, Scottish Double Smallpipes	

=== Northumbrian pipes ===
Name	Firm	Location	Apprenticed	Retired	Notes	Refs
John Dunn		Newcastle upon Tyne	1764	1820	Developed keywork for the Northumbrian smallpipe around 1800	
G.G. Armstrong		England	1877	1955		
Jack Armstrong		Wideopen, North Tyneside	1904	1978		
Robert Reid		Newcastle upon Tyne	1786	1837		
Tom Clough		Newsham	1881	1964		
Colin Ross		United Kingdom				
William H. Hedworth				1994		

=== Lincolnshire bagpipes ===
Name	Firm	Location	Apprenticed	Retired	Notes	Refs
John Addison		South Somercotes, Lincolnshire				

=== Cornish bagpipes ===
Name	Firm	Location	Apprenticed	Retired	Notes	Refs
Christopher Bayley						
Julian Goodacre		Peebles				

=== Shuttle pipes ===
Firm	Name	Location	Apprenticed	Retired	Notes	Refs
John Walsh Bagpipes Ltd.	John Walsh, Tom MacMillan	Antigonish, Nova Scotia, Canada				

== Continental European pipes ==
=== Armenian bagpipes ===
Name	Firm	Location	Apprenticed	Retired	Notes	Refs
Karen Hakobyan						

=== Estonian bagpipes (torupill) ===
Name	Firm	Location	Apprenticed	Retired	Notes	Refs
Ants Taul		Estonia				

=== Greek Bagpipes ===
Name	Firm	Location	Apprenticed	Retired	Notes	Refs
Yannis Pantazis	La Ponta				Venetian Tower Greek bagpipe exhibition-workshop	

=== Swedish bagpipes (säckpipa) ===
Name	Firm	Location	Apprenticed	Retired	Notes	Refs
Alban Faust		Sweden				
Leif Eriksson		Sweden				

== Sources ==
Bibliography

- Hardy, Neal (March 1990). "Changing Traditions: Bagpipes in Australia". Australian Folklore (4): 64–73.
- Merryweather, James W. (May 2001). "Two-chanter Bagpipes in England". The Galpin Society Journal. 54: 62–75. doi:10.2307/842446. JSTOR 842446.
- O'Neill, Francis (1973). Irish Minstrels and Musicians (1st Norwood ed.). Darby, Pennsylvania: Norwood Editions. ISBN 0-88305-494-9.
- Teahan, John (May 1963). "A List of Irish Instrument Makers". The Galpin Society Journal. 16 (16): 28–32. doi:10.2307/841092. JSTOR 841092.

News articles

- Collins, Glenn (1980-09-15). "And pipes for almost everywhere else". The New York Times. p. B14.
- Edwards, Bill (2003-11-22). "When pipes called, he answered". The Advertiser. p. 80.
- Morden, Paul (2009-11-16). "Bagpipes unfairly maligned". The Observer. pp. 1, 3.
- Prenon, Mary T. (1997-09-29). "Echoes of Scotland". Westchester County Business Journal. Vol. 36, no. 39. pp. 1, 2.
- Rosenberg, Merri (1995-10-08). "Bagpipe maker outdoes the Scots". The New York Times. p. 13WC.14.

Online resources

- "Pipers be wise, Sinclairise!". William Sinclair and Son.
- "Macbeth and Co Bagpipes".
- "Dunbar Bagpipe Maker Ltd".
- "John Walsh Bagpipes Ltd".
- "The Burley Bagpipe Company".
- "Lee & Sons Bagpipes".
- "Iona Bagpipes".
