= Bennett Bunn Plantation =

Historic house in North Carolina, United States

- U.S. National Register of Historic Places
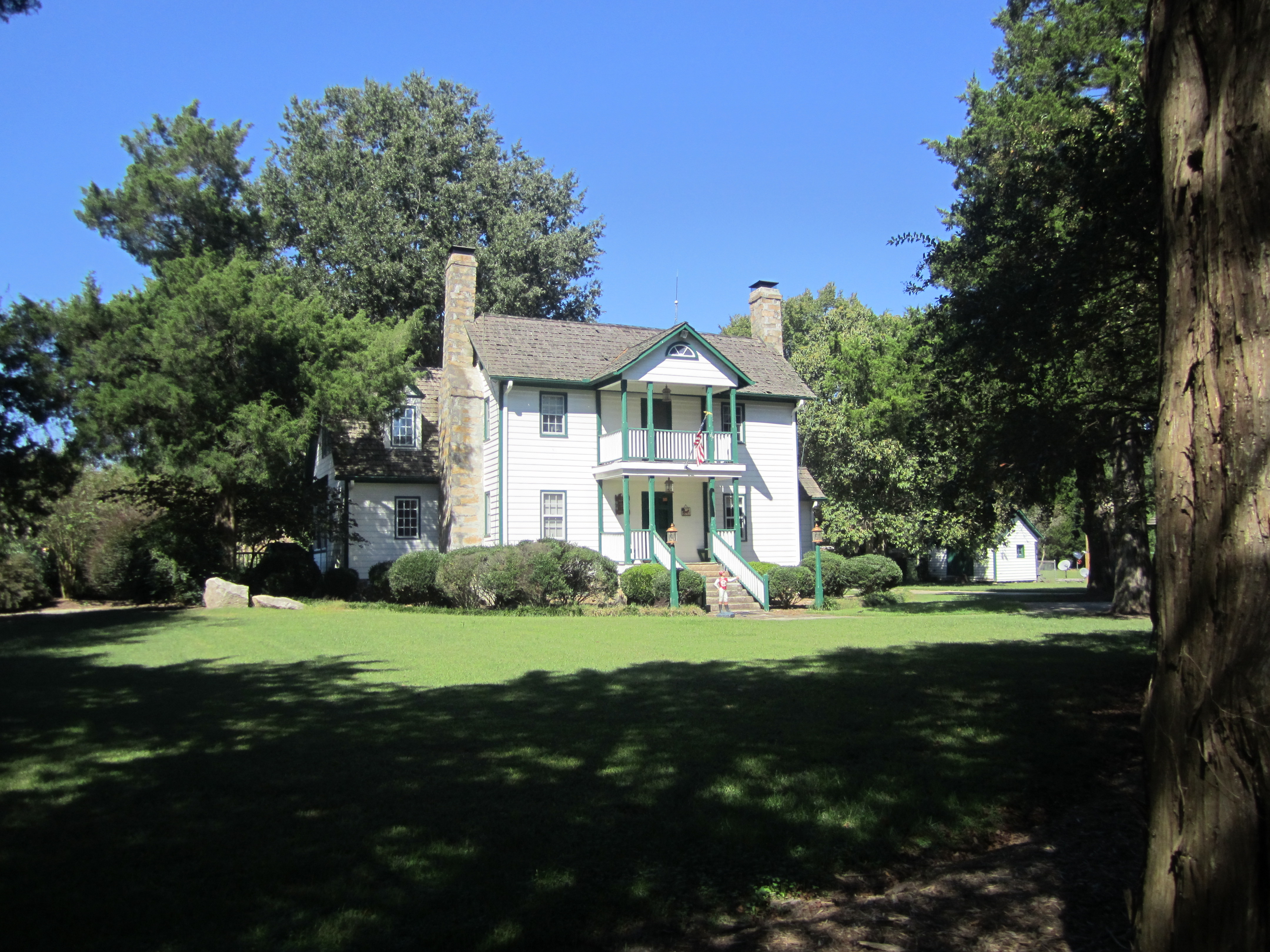

- Location within North Carolina Location within the United States
- Location: NC 97, near Zebulon, North Carolina
- Coordinates: 35°50′14″N 78°16′59″W
- Area: 181.5 acres (73.5 ha)
- Built: 1833
- Architectural style: Federal
- NRHP reference No.: 86000157
- Added to NRHP: February 4, 1986

The Bennett Bunn Plantation is a historic farm near Zebulon, North Carolina, a suburb of Raleigh. The plantation, located beside US 264 in eastern Wake County, consists of a two-story house, built in 1833, barns, and 162 acres (66 ha) of farmland and forests. The property was owned by generations of the Bunn family until 2000 when Grace Hutchins, great-granddaughter of Bennet Bunn, sold the property for $1.9 million (~$3.28 million in 2024). The home is still used as a private residence and was listed on the National Register of Historic Places in February 1986.

Bennett Bunn inherited the land from his father in the 1820s. He lived in a log cabin on the property until he had raised enough money to construct the house. With the use of 16 enslaved people, Bunn grew wheat and corn, and raised livestock. Each generation left the property to the youngest daughter. After Hutchins inherited the land, she renovated the house by installing electricity and plumbing, as well as adding a kitchen, sunroom, and bathrooms.

The Bennett Bunn house is an example of Federal architecture, a popular style for homes during the Antebellum period of the South. The driveway is lined with cedar trees that were planted in the 1920s by Alac and Avon Bunn.

During the Civil War, a robber threw a torch through a front window of the house. The mark left by the torch hitting the floor is still visible. A mantel clock that was given to the Bunns by a Union soldier is displayed in the house. The soldier had looted the clock from another location and was tired of carrying it.

A memorial to two enslaved people who died in the 1860s, Simon Bunn and Joni Piedelle, is written on one of the walls. Five enslaved people who worked at the Bunn plantation are buried in a small cemetery on the property.

== See also ==
- List of Registered Historic Places in North Carolina
