= Little River Dam and Park =

Coordinates: 35°49′20″N 78°21′9″W

Little River Dam and Park (Jaycee Park) is a small municipal park and dam along the Little River in the town of Zebulon, North Carolina.

== Mill and dam history ==
The original date of construction for Foster's Grist and Sawmill on the site of the dam is unknown but the mill was sold, along with 53 acres, by A. J. Foster in August 1868 for $2500 to a William C. Moore. The mill then became known as Moore's Mill.

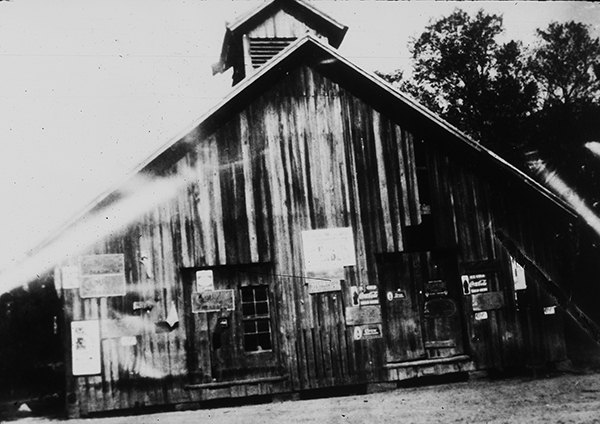
Moore's Mill, Edythe Tippett Collection, Olivia Raney Library

The mill was run by Mr. Moore and his wife through the late 1800s during which time the mill was used for various purposes including hosting visitors overnight and providing meals. On one such visit a newlywed couple, Oscar Larkin and Ellie Beckwith Stringfield, came to stay at the Moore's Mill in 1882.

“We got to Raleigh about 9:00 and were met by a man from Mr. W.C. Moore’s who had brought a nice horse and buggy for us to drive to Mr. Moore’s where we were invited to take our wedding dinner. We arrived at 1:00 before Mrs. Moore was ready for us, but Mr. Moore met us and made us welcome. This was 4 miles from Wakefield (two miles north of Zebulon) where we were to live. We spent the night and next day went to Wakefield to meet Mrs. Kemp with whom we were to board[.]”

Moore's Mill also served as the location for the local post office by 1874. Postmaster Nancy N. Liles ran the post office where local farmers and merchants would receive mail for the pony express until it was moved in 1888. Records still indicate local farmers receiving mail at the mill as late as 1896. Mr. Moore died in 1913 and the mill was sold.

In the mid-1910s the mill began to also provide power to the community. It operated a generator off a 12-cylinder Cadillac engine which provided power on Fridays and Saturdays. Zebulon later had 36 street lights which were all powered by the mill and an adjacent electric power plant. The power plant was washed away shortly after this in the 1919 flood.

Ownership of the mill and its land was transferred to the town of Zebulon in 1923. The mill was later sold to Dave Privette who owned the mill until its presumed burning in the 1950s. The town of Zebulon built a water filtration plant in 1963 and it stands near the park today. The town development plan also notes that, “Industries, too, have shared in this spreading out of cities. Modern assembly-line processes require single-story construction, and the two and three story mill of yesteryear often stands vacant today.”

== The park ==
The park was originally constructed in the 1970s in a three-acre plot of land and was then named Jaycee Park. The park fell into disuse and was abandoned by the Zebulon town parks department until a citizen by the name of John Middleswarth began to restore the park in 1985. The Zebulon's park system then adopted the park about five years later and it became known as Little River Park.

== Damage and repair ==
The dam has been damaged and repaired many times over its history. A flood in 1919 destroyed dam power facilities. Based on graffiti found on stones that would have been under the waterline at the time (stating -L.E.R March 10, 1928), there was another flood in 1928. Hurricanes in 1996, 1999, and most recently Hurricane Matthew in October 2016, have caused even more flood damage. The most recent damage from Hurricane Matthew has yet to be repaired. The Zebulon town commission voted in January not to pursue using FEMA funding to rebuild the dam and has since filed a plan to pursue streambank revitalization, which would restore the river to its original state before the existence of the dam and would remove all existing dam structures. Some of the funds would also go to building additions to the existing park and trails along the river. As of April 4, 2018, the town commission is still waiting for approval for the streambank revitalization project.
