= Whitley Furniture Galleries =

Furniture retailer in North Carolina, 1909–2022

Coordinates: 35°49′15″N 78°18′46″W

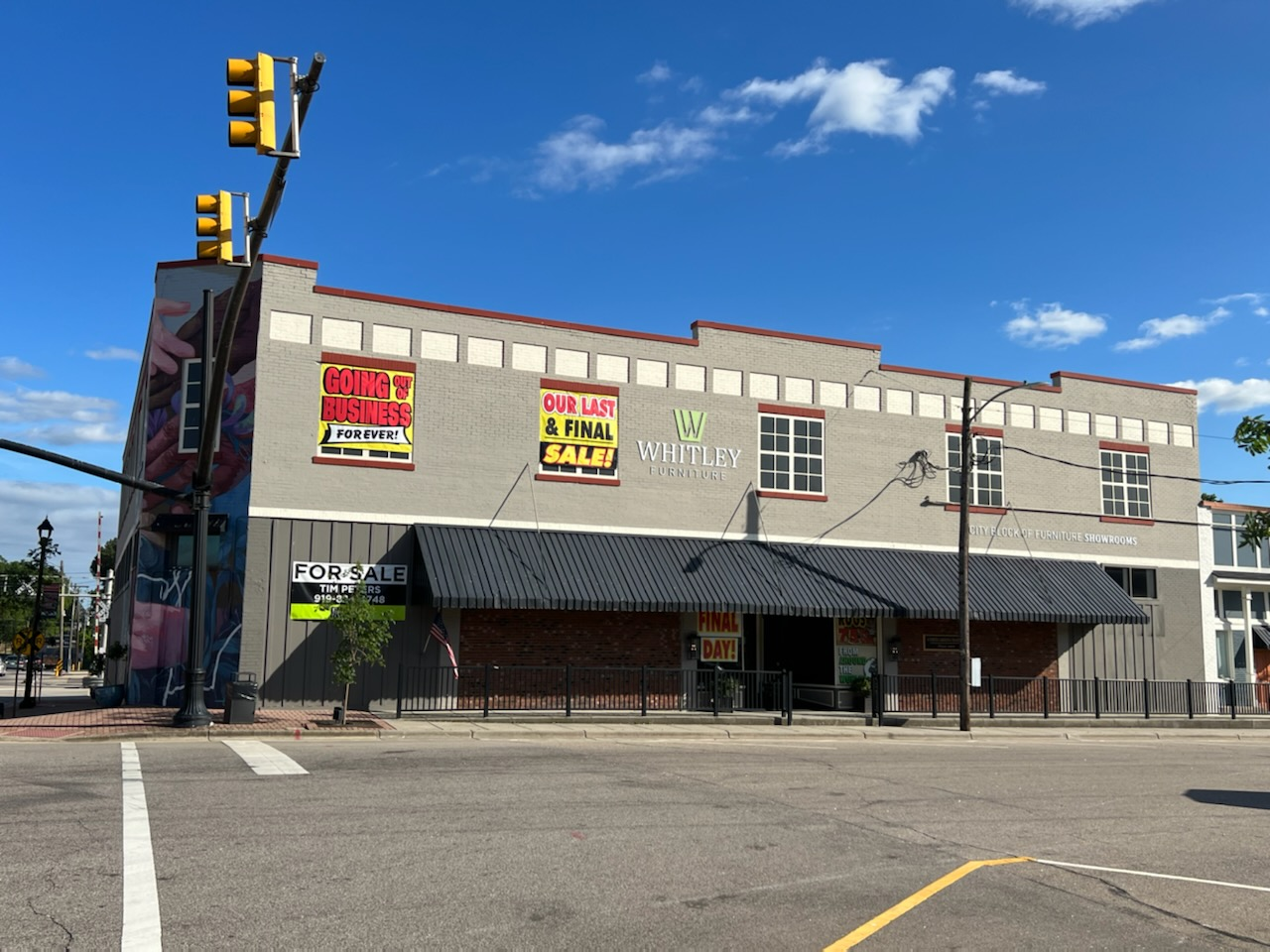
- The main building of the furniture gallery near closure
- Formerly: Zebulon Supply Company (until 1946); Whitley Furniture Company (until 1979)
- Type: Furniture retailer
- Founded: 1909
- Founder: R.J. Whitley
- Defunct: 2022; 4 years ago
- Headquarters: Zebulon, North Carolina
- Area served: The Research Triangle, Wake County, and Eastern North Carolina
- Website: whitleygalleries.com (defunct)

Whitley Furniture Galleries (abbreviated as Whitley Galleries) was a former furniture retailer located in Zebulon, North Carolina. While operational, the galleries were advertised as "Wake County's largest furniture store", and had the largest furniture stock in the Research Triangle until closing in 2022.

Founded as the Zebulon Supply Company in 1909 by R.J. Whitley, the business was passed down to his son C.V. Whitley upon his death in 1924. Under C.V., the business, which before had been a general supplies store, began to specialize in furniture. This product specialization, alongside its location in a crossroads town, large floor space, and good business practices, helped the business survive the Great Depression. Radio advertising and giveaways helped make the business one of the town's most successful businesses, and the county's largest furniture store. In January 2022, the business announced its closure after 113 years of operations, citing a lack of a fifth generation to carry on the family business. The eight buildings which made up the galleries were put on sale for $5,299,000.

== History ==
=== Founding and growth ===
Whitley Galleries was one of Zebulon's oldest business firms, beginning operations in 1909 as the Zebulon Supply Company, with R.J. Whitley as the owner and president. R.J.'s son, C. Vaiden Whitley (going only by C.V. Whitley), later began working for his father's business in 1916, and took over as president upon his death in 1924. Upon assuming control of the business, C.V. reorganized the broad product range of the supply store towards primarily furniture, as he believed "while furniture styles also change, [it is] nowhere near as quickly as do styles in ladies coats and dresses", as an example of a product he no longer would sell for this reason. Likewise, Zebulon Supply Company eventually changed its name to Whitley Furniture Company in 1946 to reflect their new product specialization.

A 1937 article by the newspaper The State claimed the galleries were probably "the biggest business enterprise you can find anywhere in the state in a town approximating the town of Zebulon", in contrast to other struggling small-town businesses during the Great Depression. The success of the business at this time was credited to its central location in a crossroads town, its modern product and large floor space, its acceptance of refunds, and other new business practices C.V. picked up while attending furniture trade shows. Notably, the practice of radio advertising on WPTF and newspaper advertisements in Raleigh's News & Observer spread awareness of the business and its seasonal giveaways across Eastern North Carolina. Their second giveaway in 1935 became their most successful, which saw between 7–15 thousand people from across Eastern North Carolina gather in the town of only one thousand at the time to watch the business' ticket drawing, with the top prize being a new automobile. In 1959, C.V. passed on the family business to his daughter Nancy Whitley and her husband Amos Estes, not long before his death in 1966.

=== Third and fourth generation ownership ===
After taking over in 1959, Whitley and Estes saw continued success with the business. In the store's adverts from this time, Whitley advertised themselves to be "Wake County's largest furniture store" and the largest full service furniture store in Eastern North Carolina. The two also continued to publicize the business in the media as C.V. had. In the 1982 North Carolina Home and Garden Show, at the time the largest of its kind in the southeast United States, Whitley Galleries decorated twenty rooms for the event alongside other area decorators. In 1987, Whitley Galleries, alongside WRAL-TV, gave away a room full of furniture valued at $10,000 during a live telecast of the Southern Ideal Home Show.

In 1979, the business once again changed names, this time from Whitley Furniture Company to Whitley Furniture Galleries. In 1993, Nancy and Amos retired, passing down the business to their son Charles and his sister Nelle. The business had the largest furniture stock in the Research Triangle until its closing in 2022.

=== Closure ===
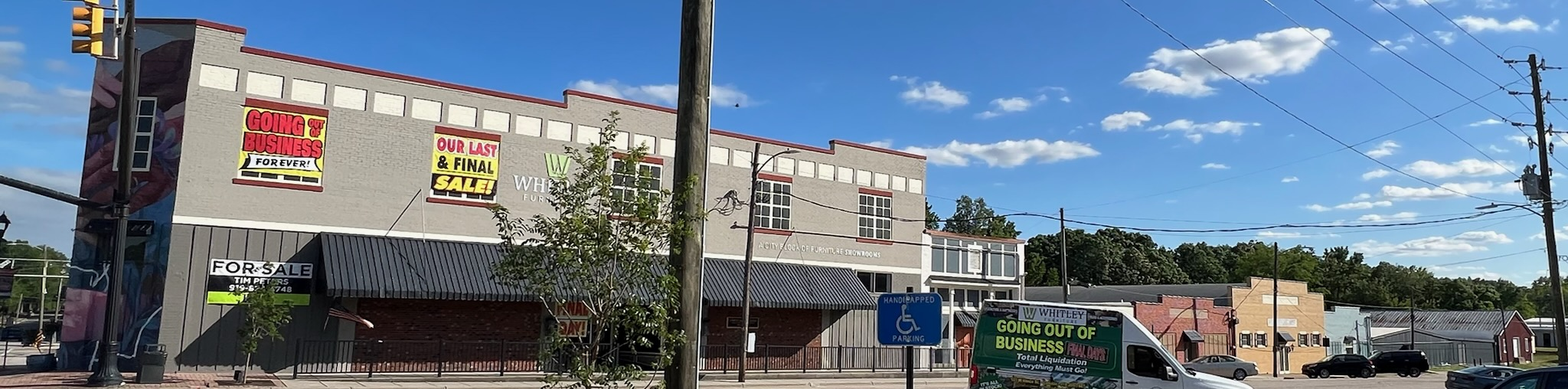
The entire furniture gallery complex near closure

On 18 January 2022, the furniture galleries announced their closure after 113 years of operations. Starting on January 20, the business began to liquidate their entire stock. This process continued until at least late February, at which point the remaining product was sold. According to the owner Charles Whitley Estes, the business' closure was the result of a lack of a fifth generation to take over, as other family members had taken different career paths. Charles had also stated it was "just time to retire" for him, after running the business together with Nelle for about 30 years. At the time of the announcement, Nelle had yet to decide if she also was going to retire from the business field.

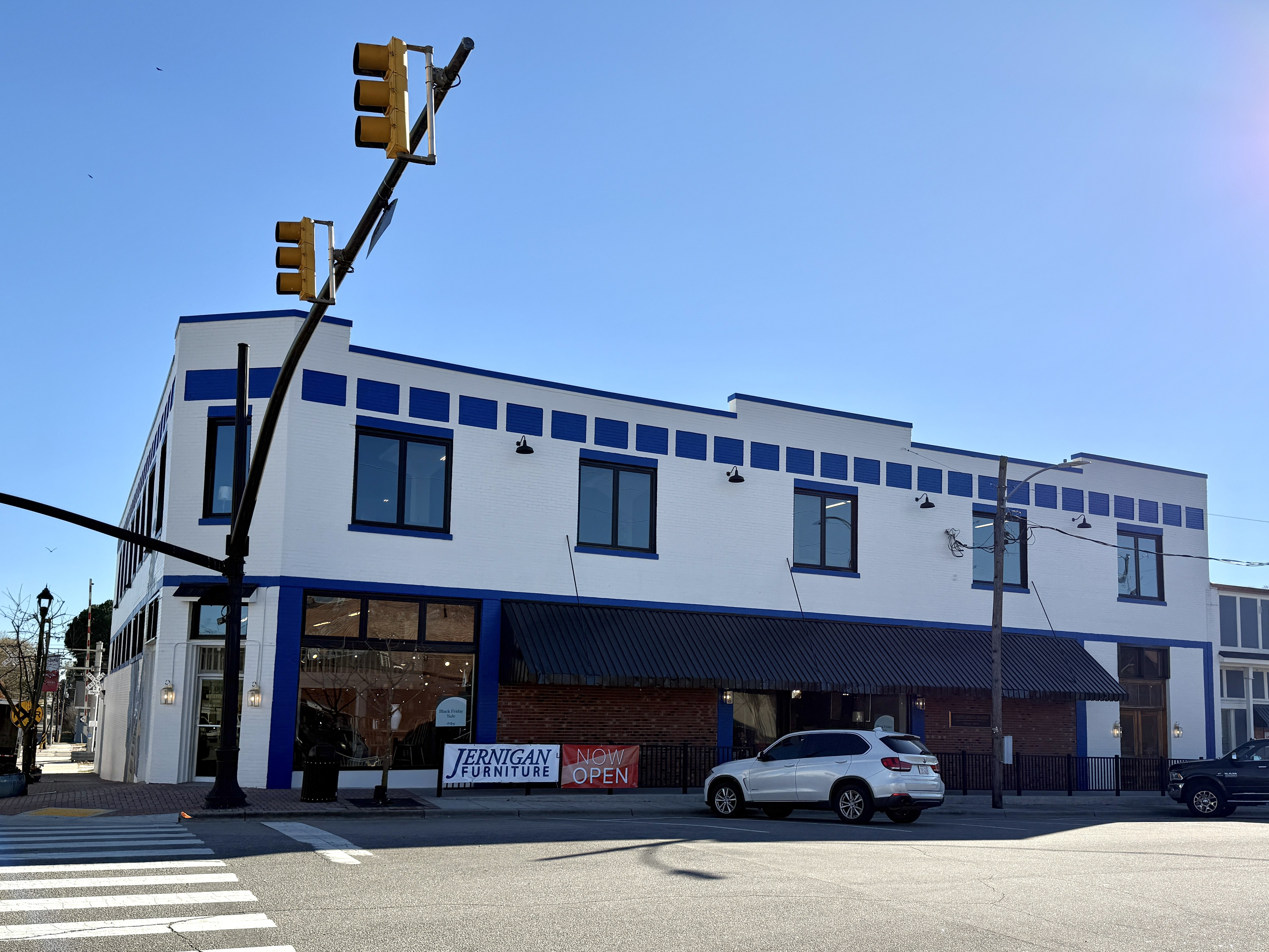
The main building of the complex after purchase by Jernigan Furniture in 2025

At its closure, the furniture galleries spanned across the whole W. Vance St. city block consisting of eight buildings (Note: The eight building addresses being 101, 113, 117, 121, 125, 135, and 149 W. Vance St. respectively, going down the block) in downtown Zebulon. The buildings covered an area of 65,463 sq ft (6,081.7 m^{2}) or 1.58 acres (0.64 ha), and were put up for sale at a price of $5,299,000. Tom Liddell, Senior VP of Planned Furniture Promotions, with whom the business partnered to sell the buildings, commented the building's proximity to Raleigh presented "tremendous re-development opportunity" alongside the galleries' "historical significance". Around three years later in July 2025, the main building of the complex was sold to Goldsboro-based furniture retailer Jernigan Furniture, who opened their third location here on September 12, 2025. After the purchase, fourth generation owner Andrew Jernigan remarked on Whitley Furniture Galleries, stating "They were the Emerald City on the hill and turned out product with the best reputation. [...] They were our closest competitors and our best friends".

== Product and services ==
While the business was still the Zebulon Supply Company, their product varied broadly with no specialization. Crops, livestock, groceries, farm machinery, hardware, and furniture were all sold, with some of their bigger products like groceries and furniture having their own departments within the store. After specializing in furniture retailing, however, their inventory reflected the change, with home decor products including dining room and bedroom suites, seating, lamps, mirrors, beds, chests, desks, china cabinets, sideboards, wall systems, and entertainment units all being sold. Product was often sourced from smaller, local companies, but some larger brands including Barcalounger, Bassett Furniture, and La-Z-Boy were also sold.

Some services the business offered included complete interior design and delivery within 100 miles of Zebulon, allowing their product to reach the wider Eastern Carolina market.

== Leadership ==
At the beginning of operations, the business started with only three salesmen. The number of employees later grew to where multiple product departments requiring individual managers was needed. These departments existed under Zebulon Supply Company to better manage their larger range of products, but were likely dissolved after their product specialization to furniture. In terms of ownership, four generations of Whitleys took turns as president of the business. The generation of the family, the owner's name, the co-owner's name (if one), and the years they operated the business are displayed in the table below.

Owners of Whitley Furniture Galleries
Gen	Owner	Co-owner	Starting year	Ending year
1	R.J. Whitley	None	1909	1924
2	C.V. Whitley	None	1924	1959
3	Nancy Whitley	Amos Estes (husband)	1959	1993
4	Charles Whitley Estes	Nelle Carroll (sister)	1993	2022
