= George and Neva Barbee House =

Historic house in North Carolina, United States

- U.S. National Register of Historic Places
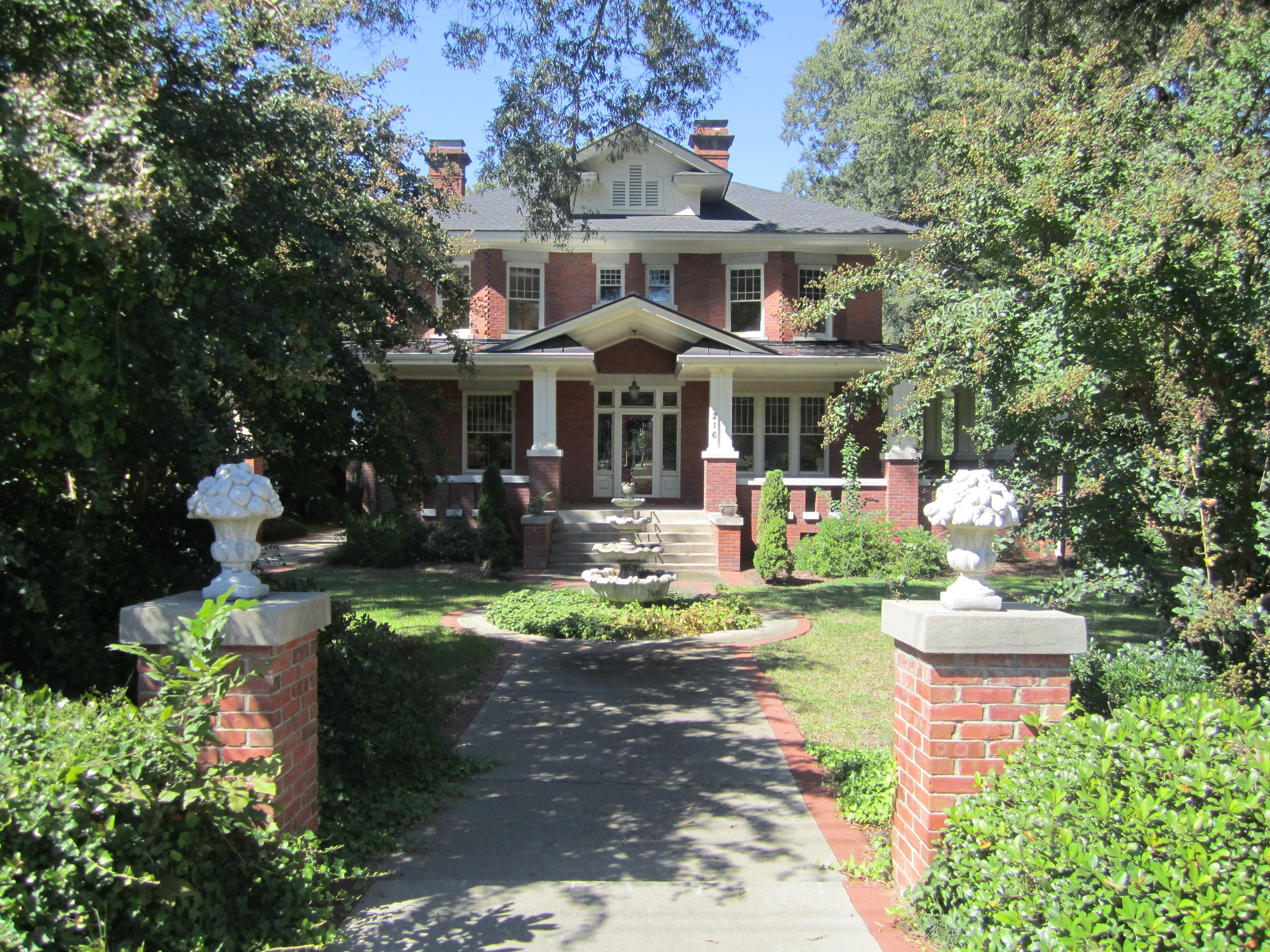

- Location within North Carolina Location within the United States
- Location: 216 W. Gannon Ave., Zebulon, North Carolina
- Coordinates: 35°49′30″N 78°19′5″W
- Area: 0.5 acres (0.20 ha)
- Built: 1914
- Architectural style: Bungalow-Craftsman
- MPS: Wake County MPS
- NRHP reference No.: 07000881
- Added to NRHP: August 28, 2007

The George and Neva Barbee House, also known as the Dr. G. S. Barbee House, is a historic home located at Zebulon, Wake County, North Carolina, a town near Raleigh, NC. Constructed in 1914, the two-story, brick American Foursquare house was designed in the American Craftsman / Bungalow style. It features a hipped roof with overhanging eaves, a porte cochere, a sheltered wraparound porch, and a nearly solid brick porch balustrade.

It was listed on the National Register of Historic Places in 2007.

== See also ==
- List of Registered Historic Places in North Carolina
