= East Wake Academy =

Charter school in Zebulon, North Carolina

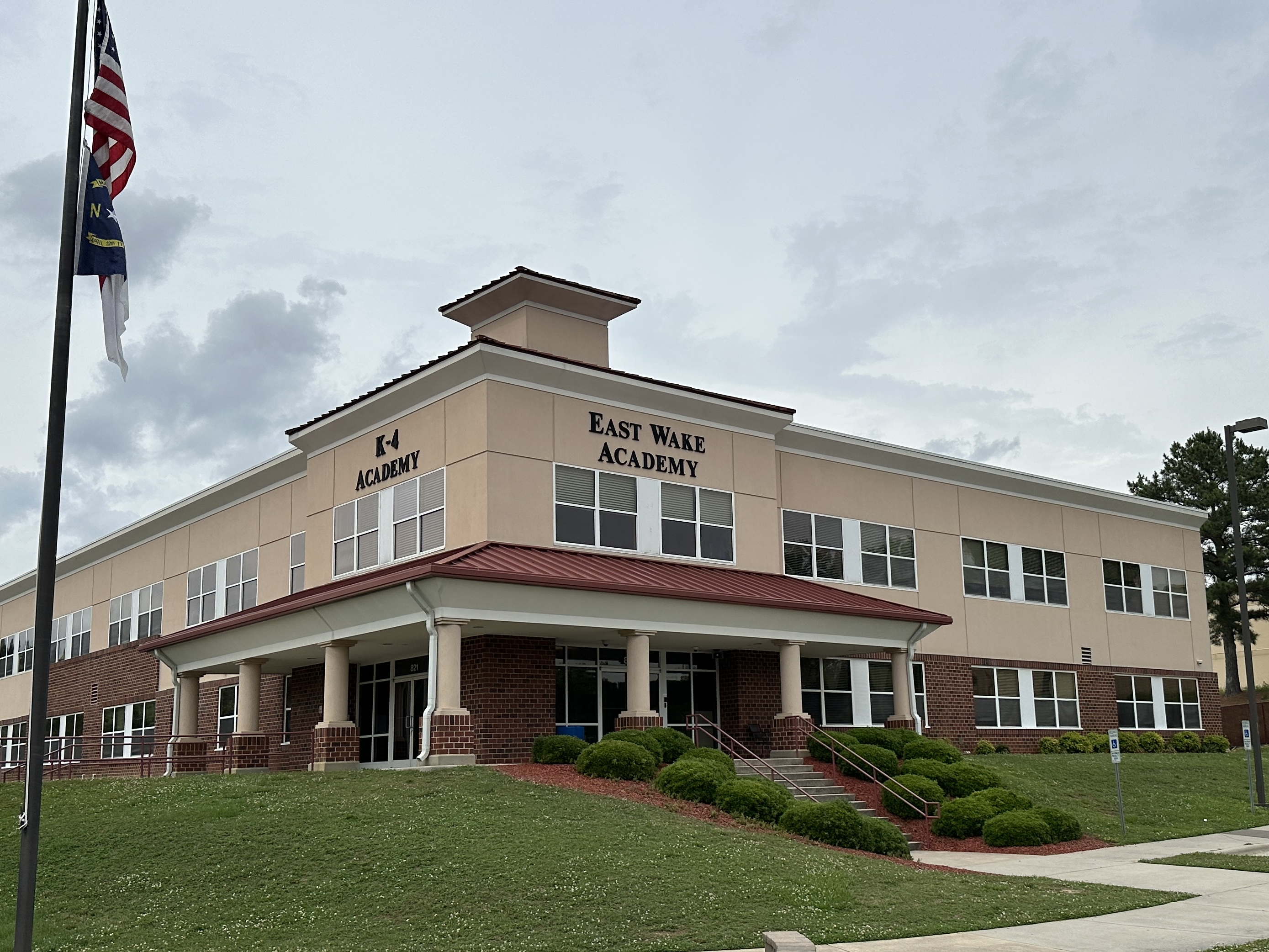
- Main building of the school in 2024

Location
- 821 Charter School Way; Zebulon, North Carolina 27597; United States; 35°49′55″N 78°18′24″W

Information
- Type: Charter
- Established: July 6, 1998; 28 years ago
- School district: Wake County Public School System
- NCES District ID: 3700070
- NCES School ID: 370007002416
- Director: Anthony Pirrello
- Principal: Allison Stancil (Elementary)
- Principal: Lisa Davis (Middle)
- Principal: Darrell Johnson (High)
- Teaching staff: 80.33 (on an FTE basis)
- Grades: K–12
- Gender: Coeducational
- Enrollment: 1,227 (2022–23)
- Student to teacher ratio: 15.27
- Campus type: Rural
- Colors: Red, White, and Blue
- Athletics conference: Super Six Conference (SS6) (Varsity level)
- Mascot: Eagles
- Website: eastwakeacademy.org

East Wake Academy (EWA) is a public charter school located in Zebulon, North Carolina, United States. Founded in 1998, the school is made up of three separate academies to cover grades K–12, with admission to the academies being decided via lottery system. The creation of the school was conceived in October 1997 by a group of locals led by Susan King, with the intention to bring greater school choice to the area. After a rocky first school year characterized by the student body being spread out across two buildings in Knightdale and Wendell, the school was centralized into its current location in Zebulon in 1999 under Headmaster Michelle Taylor, and school spirit improved. Since 2012, two employees have been fired for criminal sexual activity.

== Structure ==
East Wake Academy is a public charter school, meaning any parents can register their children for enrollment, but admission is decided via a lottery system when first applying. If the school does not over enroll, then all students who registered are accepted. Re-enrollment is required for each following year. As a K–12 school, the academy is divided into three parts: the K–4 Academy (Elementary school) spanning grades K–4, the Middle Academy (Middle school) spanning grades 5–8, and the Senior Academy (High school) spanning grades 9–12. Being a charter school, the school is run by a local board of directors as opposed to the North Carolina State Board of Education for public schools. Students are also required to wear uniforms and sign a code of conduct with their parents.

As of the 2022–2023 school year, East Wake Academy has 1,227 students enrolled; composed of 653 males and 574 females. 72% of the students ethnicity is registered as White, 11% as Black, 10% as Hispanic, 5% as two or more races, 1% as Asian, and <1% American Indian. There are 452 students enrolled at the K–4 Academy, 391 enrolled at the Middle Academy, and 384 at the Senior Academy. The student to teacher ratio is approximately 15:1.

== History ==
"We're just trying to show people that children can learn without the tangled web of bureaucracy. Our children will be at a 12th-grade level when they're in the 10th grade. They'll be learning at a higher level than students in traditional schools."

— Founding board member Susan King, in a newspaper interview, February 1998.

The conception of a charter school in Zebulon was first applied for by a group of originators led by a local named Susan King in October 1997, with the intention of bringing greater school choice to the surrounding area. The proposal was approved by the state about two months later on January 7, 1998, alongside twenty other charter schools in the same week. The approval was part of a state-wide initiative to create more charter schools, particularly around the capital area, which had the intended result of growing the number of charter schools in North Carolina from 33 to 59 by the end of the year. This approval by the state meant much of the school's funding was raised by state and county taxes rather than individuals, with the exception of buying personal equipment and school uniforms.

With funding secured, coordination for the creation of the school took place at the Parrish Realty building on Arendell Ave. in Zebulon, where an executive board of nine members also helped spread information about charter schools to parents in the town. This campaigning led to 130 families in Zebulon to approve of the formation of this type of school, many of whom were among the first to enroll their children when registration began on March 16, 1998. Despite the school's success in gathering funds and public support: no definitive building, headmaster, teachers, desks, or other essential school supplies had been picked by this point.

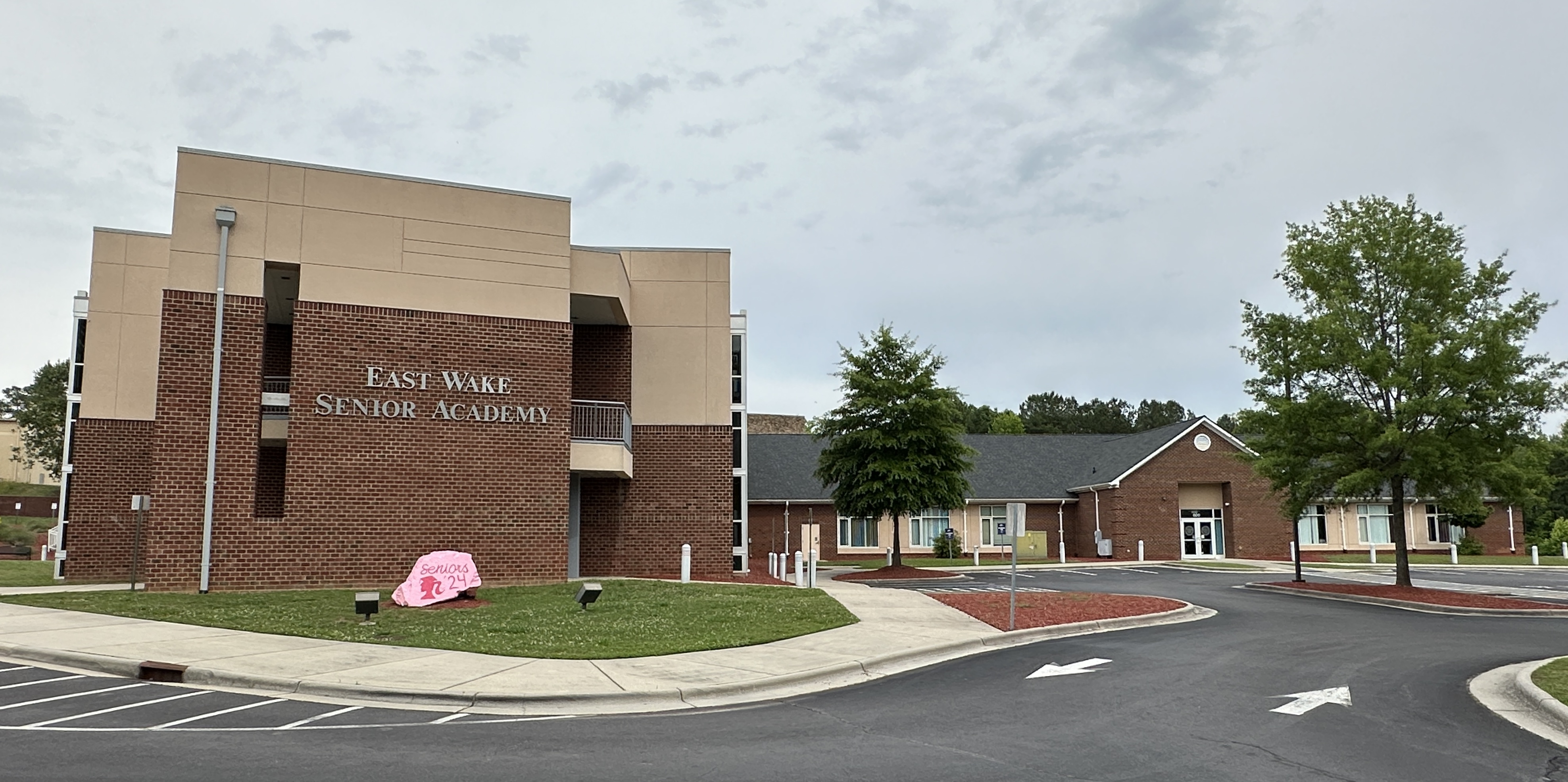
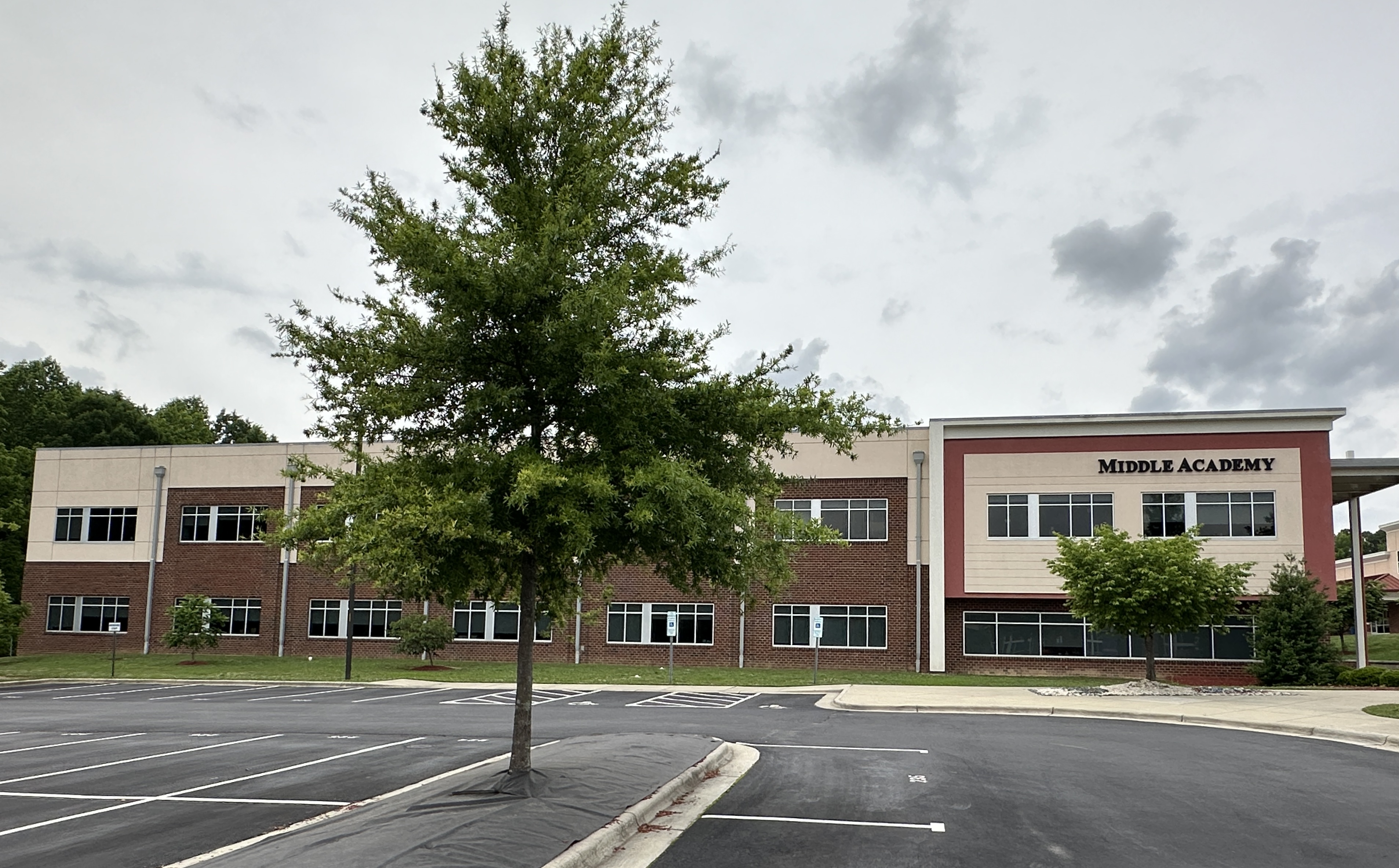
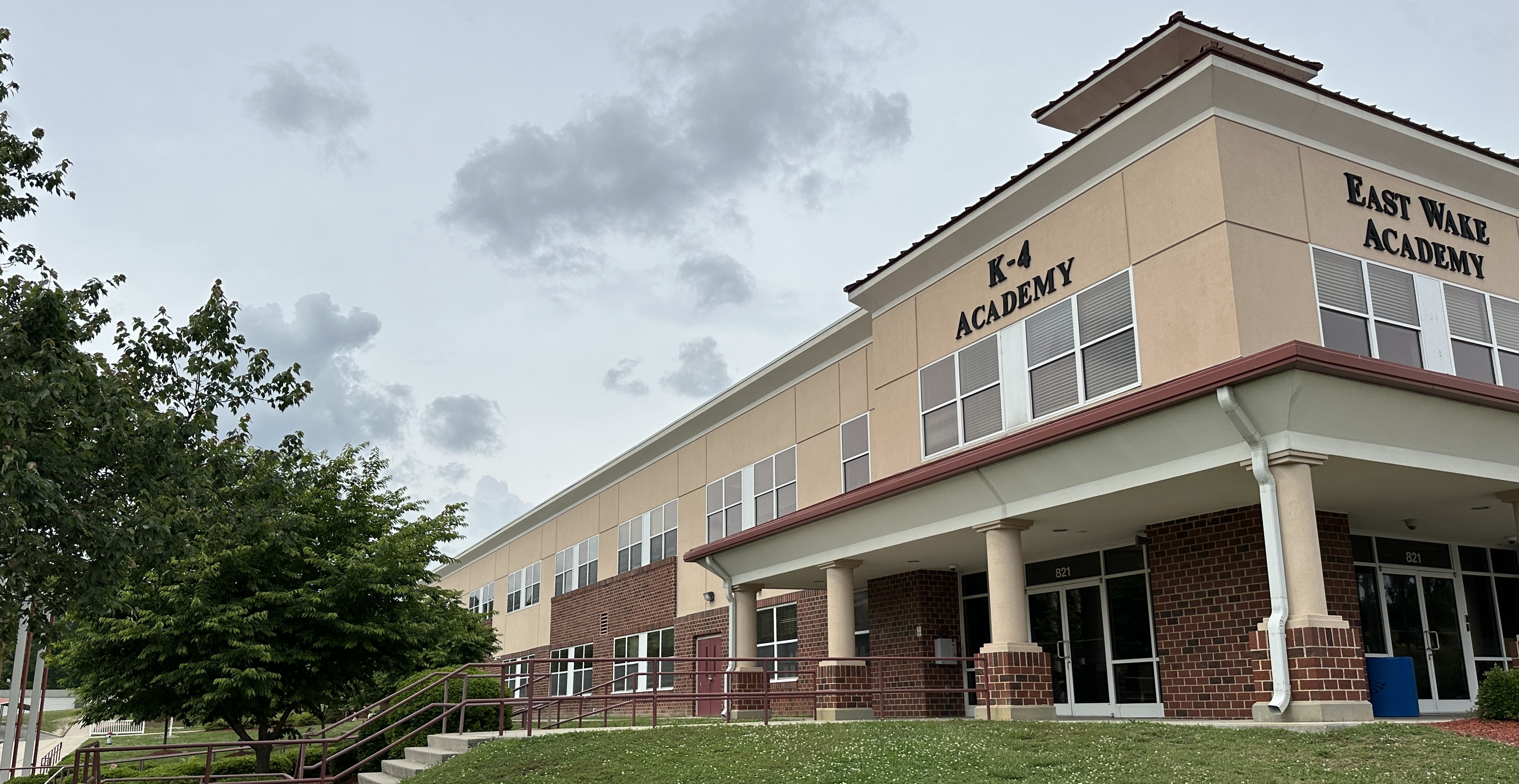
Views of the Senior Academy (top), Middle Academy (middle), and K–4 Academy (bottom), which make up the school

The school first opened for the 1998–1999 school year on July 6, 1998, with an inaugural class of 462 students. Due to a permanent site not having been finalized by the beginning of the school year though, the school opened with only two main buildings: one for the K–4 Academy and the other for the Middle Academy, situated 4 miles (6.4 km) apart from each other. One of the schools shared half a building with the Wake Opportunities business in Knightdale, and the other shared half with Hephzibah Baptist Church in Wendell. The situation created classrooms described as "small, to say the least," according to the first Headmaster W. Lane Dickens, which at the Wendell church location, had to be completely disassembled each Wednesday and Friday because of church activities.

In an attempt to fix the largely dysfunctional situation, Dickens was replaced as headmaster only one month after the school opened by another local named Michelle Taylor. Under Taylor, all but 120 of the 482 students of the class of 1999–2000 were moved to 14 mobile unit classrooms in a centralized 26 acres (11 ha) area in Zebulon where the current school grounds remain today. The remaining 120 Kindergarten and first grade students still located at the satellite location in Knightdale were moved to the new centralized campus in late August 1999. The resulting unification of the campuses directly led to an increase in relationships between teachers at different grade levels, and an increase in school spirit, according to Taylor. Alongside the creation of a ninth grade classroom, the first school activities and programs also began during this time, including a student-led initiative to develop an internet address and newsletter for the school.

In March 2012, the headmaster of the school for nearly ten years, Brandon Smith, who had gotten the school recognized as a "school of excellence", was fired after sexual assault allegations were brought against him by two female school employees. On February 26, 2013, Smith was indicted and later charged on September 30, 2013, with two counts sexual battery, sentenced to two consecutive 60-day jail sentences, and forced to register as a sex offender. In November 2018, the school was equipped with a steel-pin door locking system by RhinoWare, which could be activated in case of a lockdown. In 2019, the school exceeded the framework performance expectations set by the North Carolina Department of Public Instruction. On June 15, 2022, Miguel Bonano, a teacher at the school since 2003, was arrested for indecent liberties with a student and indecent liberties with a child after a several week long investigation by the Zebulon Police Department. Bonano was subsequently fired and prohibited from being in the presence of a minor without supervision. Today, the U.S. News & World Report ranks the school #28 in the Raleigh Metro Area, #109 in North Carolina, #515 in Charter schools, and #4,014 nationally.

== Extracurricular ==
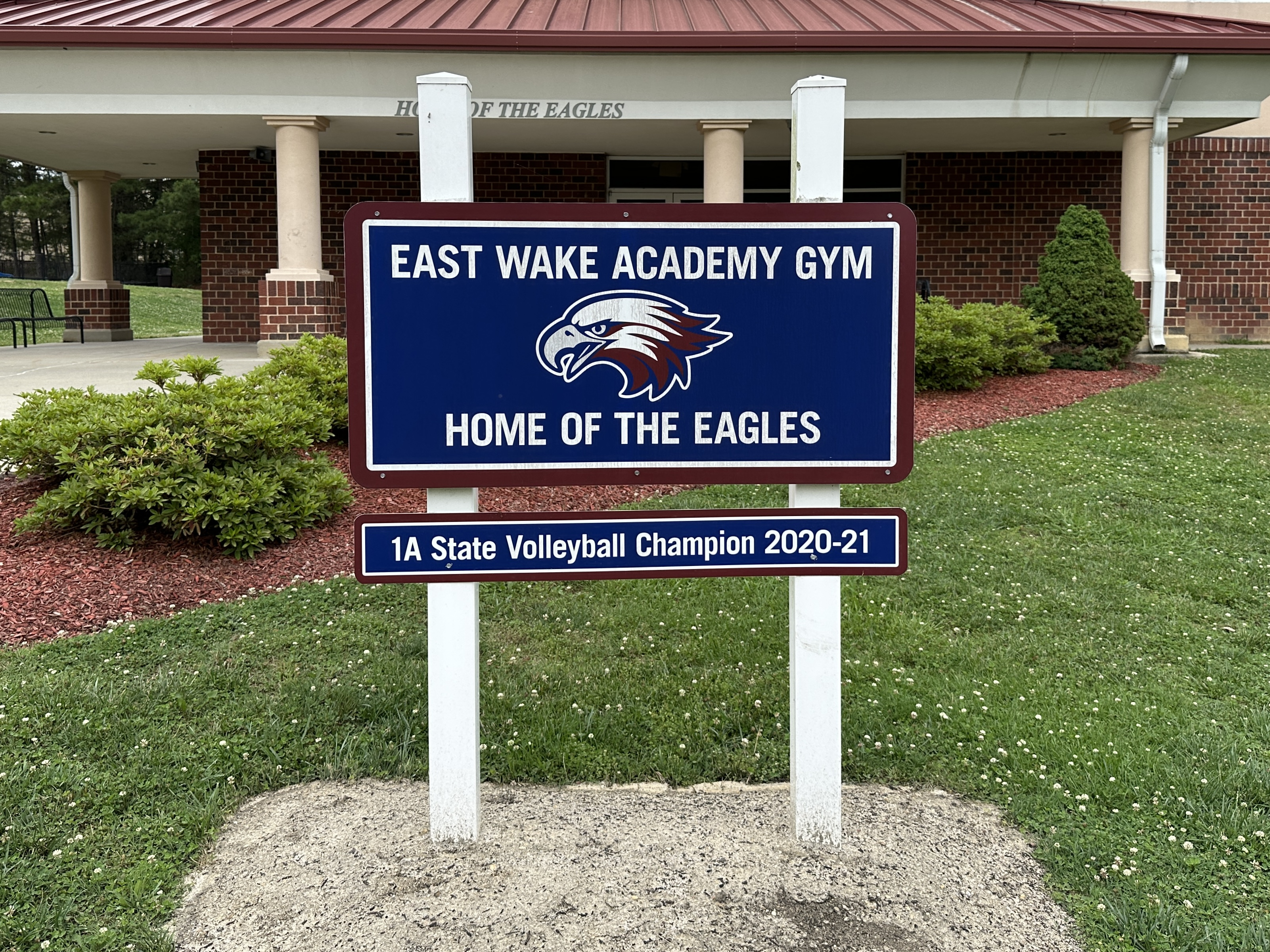
Entrance sign to school's gym, advertising their 2021 1–A State Volleyball Championship title

East Wake Academy is a member of the North Carolina High School Athletic Association (NCHSAA) and are currently classified as a 2A school. The school is a part of the Diamond Nine 1A/2A/3A Conference.

The school hosts teams for students in grades 6–12 for the sports baseball, men's basketball, women's basketball, cheerleading, cross country, men's golf, women's golf, men's soccer, women's soccer, softball, and volleyball.

In volleyball, the team in 2021 won the NCHSAA 1A state championship after defeating former state champions Mountain Island Charter School 3–1. The win marked the first state title ever won by the school.

The school hosts 14 clubs and organizations for students in their Senior Academy as of the 2023–2024 school year: including Art club, Cancer Awareness club, Community Service club, Book club, Debate club, Eagle Ambassadors, First Priority, Future Business Leaders of America (FBLA), Gaming club, National Art Honor Society (NAHS), National Honor Society (NHS), Spanish club, Student Government Association (SGA), and Unity club.

== Notable alumni ==
- Ezra O'Neal, wakeboarder, won world championship in his division
