= Olde Raleigh Distillery =

Distillery in Zebulon, North Carolina

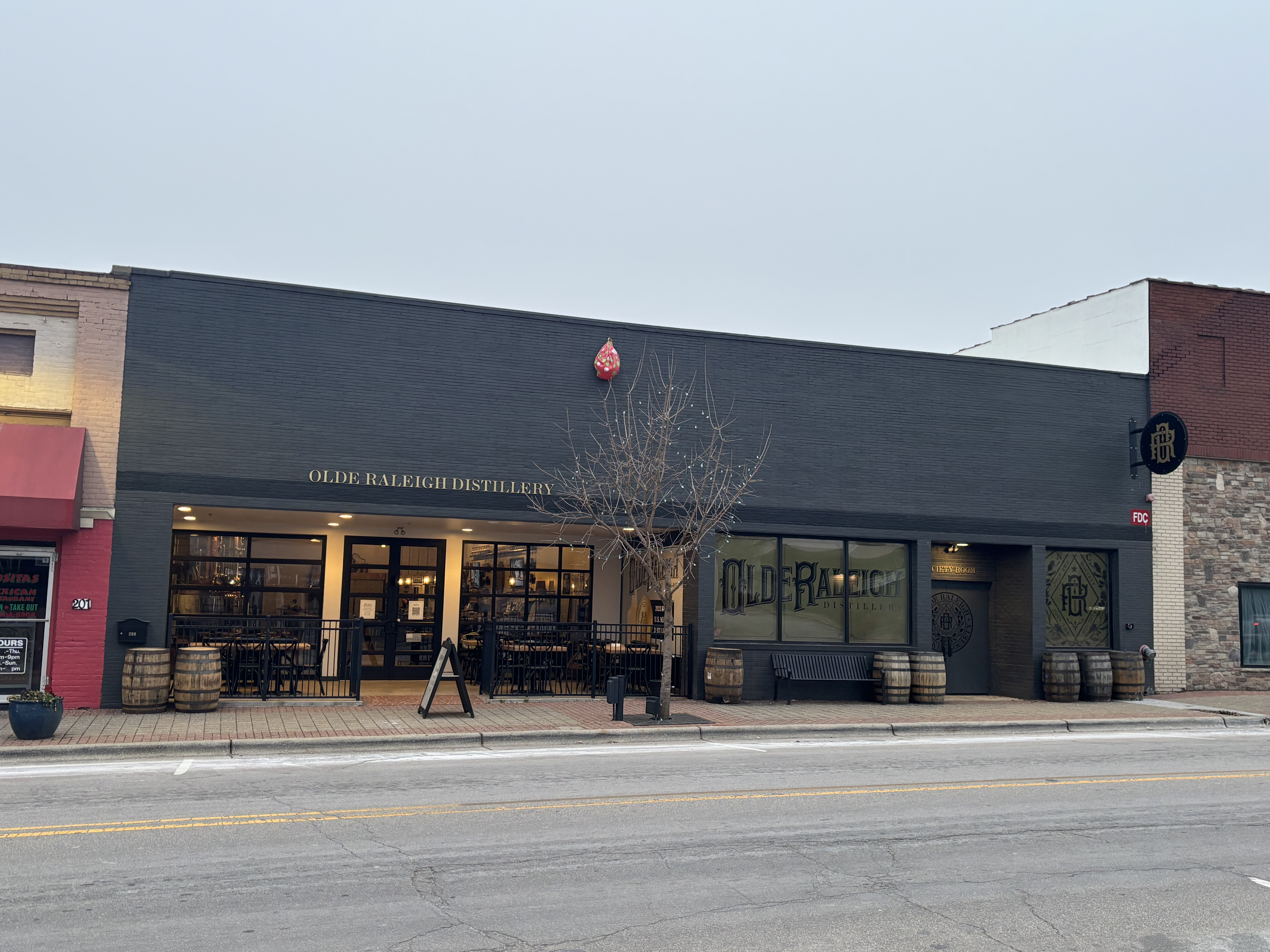
- Storefront of the distillery in 2025
- Interactive map of Olde Raleigh Distillery
- Type: Microdistillery
- Location: Zebulon, North Carolina, US
- Coordinates: 35°49′20.5″N 78°18′49″W
- Opened: January 22, 2021; 5 years ago
- Owner: Brandon McCraney
- Employees: 2+
- Distribution: North Carolina, about 40 other states
- Website: olderaleighdistillery.com

Olde Raleigh Distillery is a microdistillery located in Zebulon, North Carolina, United States. Since opening on January 22, 2021, the distillery has gained local as well as national recognition and distributes to forty states. In 2023, Olde Raleigh was awarded "Best Micro Distillery Whiskey" in the U.S. in the annual International Whisky Competition.

The distillery specializes in blending different small batch whiskey recipes using traditional Scottish methods. Approximately 1,500 bottles are produced every two months, with occasional limited releases in between. In addition to whiskey, they also offer non-alcoholic alternatives including cider and punch, as well as a small selection of food meant to complement the drinks. The distillery also hosts food trucks, live music, and educational courses on whiskey blending through its Whiskey Society.

The idea for the distillery began in January 2017, when North Carolina State University alumnus Brandon McCraney decided to pursue his aspiration in craft distilling after years in corporate jobs. After educating himself in the field and searching for a location, McCraney eventually settled on Zebulon, a suburb of Raleigh, in September 2019. The distillery's opening was delayed, however, due to permitting challenges and restrictions relating to North Carolina's status as an Alcoholic beverage control state, until 2021. Since then, Olde Raleigh has supported the growth of other business locally by collaborating with the Chamber of Commerce, including encouraging MacLellan Bagpipes' move to the town in August 2021. Creating new recipes, small business partnerships, and potentially moving to the distillery's namesake, Raleigh, are all stated short and long-term goals.

== Overview and menu ==
Olde Raleigh Distillery is a microdistillery that specializes in blending different small batch whiskey recipes together to create unique flavors. The distillery sources its whiskey nationally from five states: North Carolina, Colorado, Indiana, Kentucky, and Wyoming. Once gathered, the whiskey is stored and aged in barrels at the distillery. Once matured, it is blended using traditional Scottish methods from the 19th century. The distillery follows a batch release schedule of every two months, with occasional limited releases in between. Batches typically consist of around 1,500 bottles. Finished batches are either used at the distillery or distributed across North Carolina and to about forty other states. The distillery uses four grains in its whiskey production: malted barley, corn, rye, and wheat. It also opts for heirloom corn varieties, rather than mass-produced ones associated with consistent taste, for more distinctive flavors. Additionally, the honey used at the distillery, such as in their honey cask finished bourbon, is sourced from Baxter's Bees, which is also based in town.

In addition to whiskey and bourbon, the distillery offers a variety of beverages, including craft beers, craft cocktails, liquor, wine, and non-alcoholic options like lemonade, cider, and punch. After September 2022, the distillery partnered with the nearby Wendell business Workbench Roasters to serve bourbon barrel-aged coffee. A small food menu, designed to accompany the bourbon selection, includes candied bacon, chocolate pecan pie, and honey cheesecake. The distillery also hosts food trucks, live music, and music bingo on all days except Monday. The interior features an industrial design, incorporating reclaimed wood from the previous business' rafters for key elements like the 61 ft (19 m) long bar top spanning much of the main tasting room. The stills used are also displayed in the tasting area. The 10,400 sq ft (970 m^{2}) building also includes an event space for private parties, with a capacity of up to 200 guests.

The flagship brand of the distillery is the "Olde Raleigh Whiskey Society", a membership program that offers access to rare whiskey bottles each month, exclusive access to bourbon at private events, and educational experiences focused on whiskey blending. Members can also participate in blending events and sample from the barrel at the start of a blend. The society began during the COVID-19 pandemic, hosting virtual bi-weekly meetings. In March 2024, the society had 200 members.

== History ==
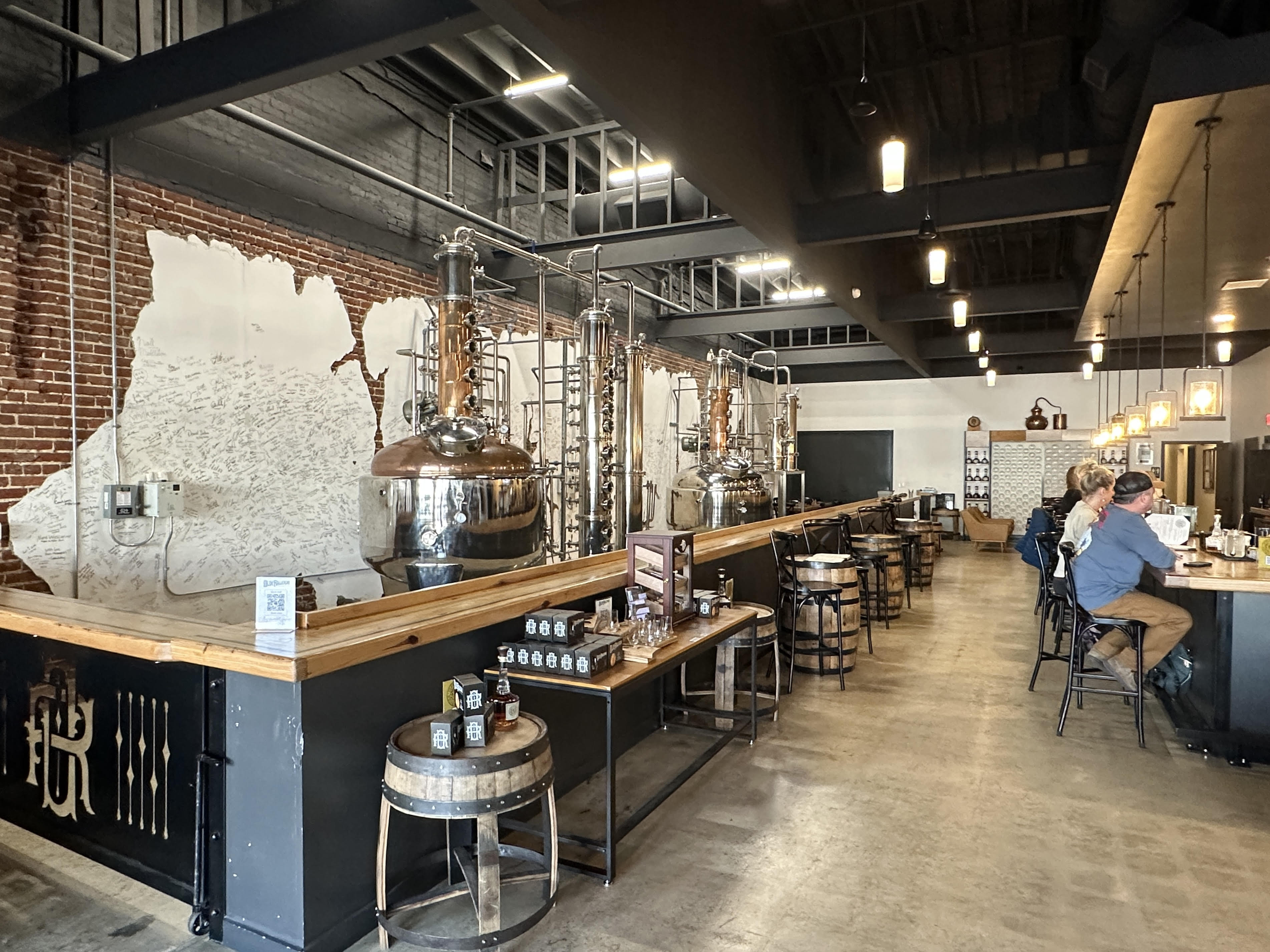
Interior of the distillery in 2025

The distillery was founded by Brandon McCraney, a North Carolina State University alumnus and father, who had been interested in the complexities of whiskey aging and maturation for more than a decade prior. Despite having worked successful corporate jobs in business sales and food services, McCraney decided to pursue his aspiration for opening a distillery in January 2017. He began by visiting distilleries across the United States to learn about their operations, in the process acquiring hundreds of types of whiskey. He also took specialized courses, including one on moonshine in Louisville, Kentucky, and a whiskey sommelier class in Texas. After two years of this, McCraney then began his initial attempts to open a distillery in Raleigh, North Carolina. However, high real estate costs, combined with unfavorable zoning in industrial areas outside of a central, community-oriented area, made the city not viable. After considering other towns in the suburbs of Raleigh, McCraney chose Zebulon, North Carolina in September 2019, as the location met his previously listed wants, and received support from the local Chamber of Commerce and permitting department. In Zebulon, McCraney began renovations an abandoned building which had previously housed a department store for 50 years. Despite an initial goal to open in April or May 2020, the distillery only opened on January 22, 2021, as issues during renovation, permitting challenges, and other restrictions related to North Carolina's status as an Alcoholic beverage control state delayed it. Despite these setbacks, continued support from the Chamber of Commerce helped facilitate the distillery's opening,

After overcoming the setbacks in starting his business, McCraney became an advocate for the expansion of other businesses into downtown Zebulon: becoming a member of the town Chamber of Commerce, and offering his distillery as a meeting space for discussions on local growth. One such business, MacLellan Bagpipes, moved into a vacant storefront next to the distillery after its owner performed a well-received piece there on August 28, 2021. Other efforts to raise the distillery's profile included operating a booth in Five County Stadium, home of the local minor league baseball team the Carolina Mudcats, featuring at large events such as the annual "Beer, Bourbon, & BBQ" festival in Charlotte, North Carolina, and featuring in the 21st season of the PBS travel series "NC Weekend" in 2023. These efforts helped attract out-of-state customers and boosted event space sales in 2023.

As the state's continued status as an Alcoholic beverage control state hinders sales, McCraney has expressed interest in the creation of a "social district" in downtown Zebulon, which would permit alcohol consumption in public areas within designated blocks. Additional goals include adding a vodka and gin line, experimenting with new recipes, forming further partnerships with local businesses, and potentially relocating the distillery to its namesake, Raleigh, in the long term. McCraney has expressed no plans to expand the brand into multiple locations, but to establish Olde Raleigh as a destination distillery in The Research Triangle and taking "spotlight off of Kentucky".

== Awards ==
In the International Whisky Competition in 2023, the distillery won first in "Best Micro Distillery Whiskey" in the US, second and third in "Best North Carolina Whiskey" with its straight and blended bourbon, and third in "Best Barrel Finish/Special Cask Whiskey" with its straight bourbon. In 2024, the distillery won first place in "Best North Carolina Whiskey" with its straight bourbon. British magazine The Spirits Business had the distillery's blended bourbon whiskey bottle place in the top 10 of their 2021 Design & Packaging Masters. In 2023, the Zebulon Chamber of Commerce awarded the distillery the "Most Influential Business Award" for its community building.
