= Shuttle pipes =

Bagpipes from France

Shuttle Pipes
Woodwind instrument
- Classification: Aerophone; Wind; Woodwind; Bagpipe

Related instruments
- Border pipes; Northumbrian pipes; Pastoral pipes; Scottish smallpipes

Shuttle pipes are a type of bagpipes which derive their name from the drones used to produce the harmony. Rather than the long tube-like drones of most bagpipes, shuttle pipes use a shuttle drone, a cylindrical chamber enclosing a series of folded drone tubes, each terminating in a slot covered by a sliding "shuttle" which can be adjusted to lengthen or shorten the distance traveled by air moving through the tube, thus flattening or sharpening the pitch of the note produced.

Like other bagpipes, shuttle pipes have a chanter which is used to play the melody. Some modern versions use Great Highland bagpipe fingering so that Highland bagpipers can easily play it. The bag of the modern shuttle pipe is either mouth-inflated through a blowpipe (or blowstick), or bellows-inflated.

Shuttle pipes appeared during the latter half of the 16th century, possibly in France, influenced by the Rackett, and were popular in the 17th and 18th centuries. The original form is generally believed to have been bellows-blown—a drawing of a set of bellows-blown shuttle pipes appears in a 1618 Syntagma Musicum (Treatise of Music) by composer and music theorist Michael Praetorius (1571–1621), and a bellows-blown French form, the musette de cour, is portrayed by Flemish baroque artist Sir Anthony van Dyck (1599–1641) in his early 1630s painting Portrait of François Langlois. The musette de cour was reputedly played by King Louis XIV of France (1638–1715). Interest in the shuttle pipes waned in the 19th century, and they were nearly forgotten by the early 20th century, but they were rediscovered in the 1980s, and they now fill a niche in popular and traditional music for a bagpipes sound where highland pipes would be overwhelming.

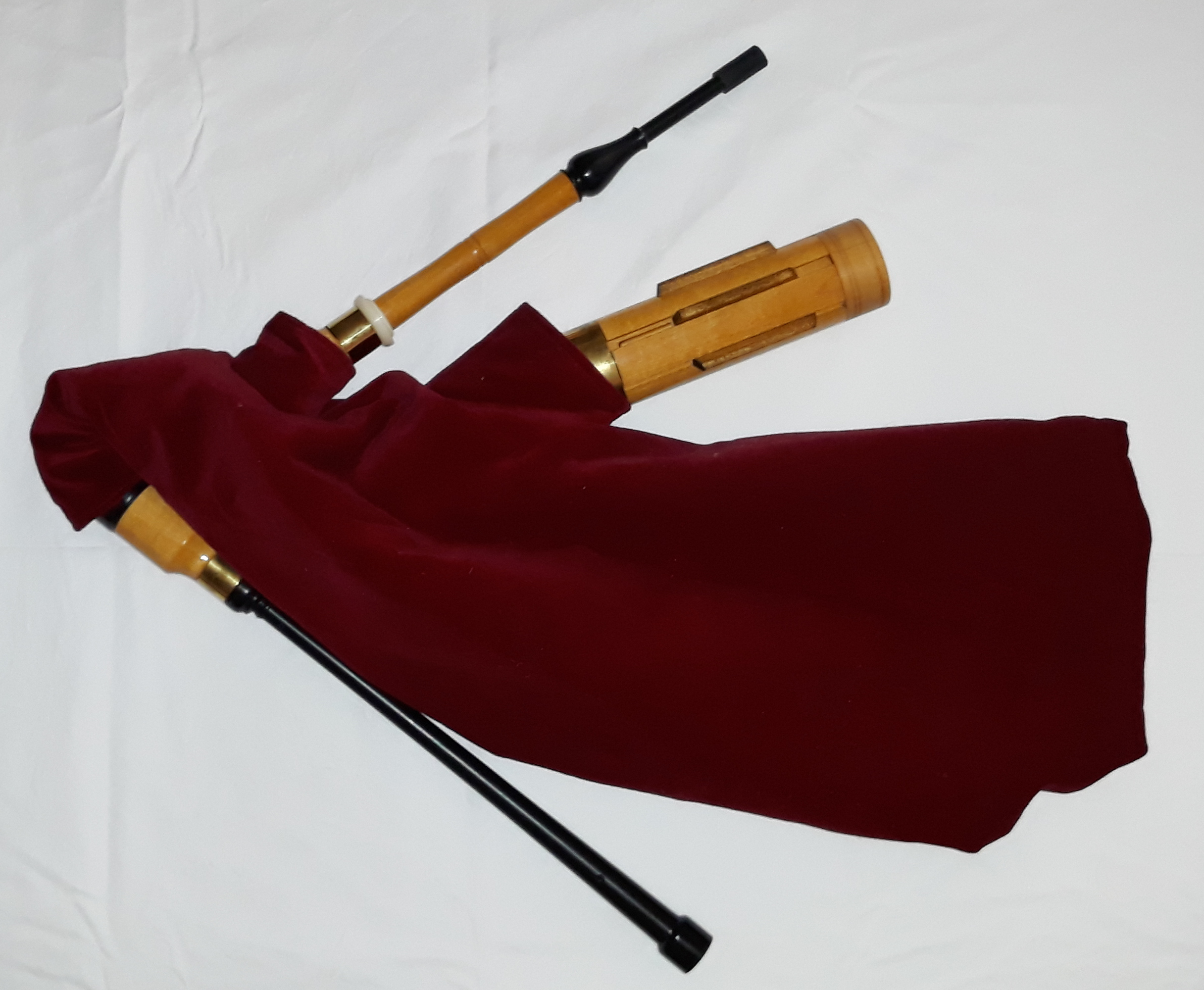
A modern shuttle pipe made by John Walsh.

== See also ==
- Glossary of bagpipe terms
- List of bagpipe makers
- List of bagpipers
- List of bagpipes
- Pastoral pipes
