= Roddy MacLellan =

Scottish bagpipe maker (born 1956)

- Born: September 25, 1956 (age 70); Glasgow, Scotland, UK
- Education: Glasgow School of Art
- Occupation: Bagpipe maker
- Years active: 1988–present
- Children: 2

Roddy (Roderick) MacLellan (born 1956) is a Scottish bagpipe maker, currently based out of his store MacLellan Bagpipes in Zebulon, North Carolina. His business is the only one in North America to make, sell, and teach how to play bagpipes, and one of the few stores offering custom bagpipe making in the world.

Born in the 1950s in Scotland, MacLellan graduated from the Glasgow School of Art in 1980 after studying metalsmithing and woodworking. In search of more opportunity, MacLellan immigrated to the United States when he was 22, working as a silversmith and fashion photographer in New York City for a number of businesses. He became inspired in bagpipe making after hearing the instruments at his wedding, and soon began creating them as a hobby. After improving in skill, he switched to bagpipe making full time in the 1990s, setting up a workshop under the name "MacLellan Bagpipes" in New York, South Carolina, and North Carolina, before moving again in North Carolina to his business's current location in Zebulon.

African blackwood, alongside less traditionally used Cocobolo and other woods, moose antlers, and other materials are used in the bagpipe making process, which takes a week or longer to create one bagpipe. This work includes turning wood and metal on lathe and other specialized metalworking techniques done in the workshop. MacLellan's pieces have been used by a number of bands worldwide, including at the Royal Edinburgh Military Tattoo, and were named a finalist in the "Coolest Thing Made in N.C." annual online competition run by the North Carolina Chamber of Commerce.

== Early life and education ==
When I first started it was because no one else was doing it. Then everything would have to come in from Scotland, so I thought... why not do this here, ya know!? That's kind of how it happened. A little bit by accident.

— Roddy MacLellan, January 2023 interview with WTVD

MacLellan was born and grew up in Glasgow, Scotland, where he began playing bagpipes casually as a child. He later studied metalsmithing and woodworking at the Glasgow School of Art, from which he graduated in 1980, but had few job prospects at the time. This motivated MacLellan to immigrate to the United States when he was 22, where he settled in New Jersey to work in New York City for greater opportunity. He began working as a silversmith for Cartier, specializing in jewelry, and was able to help craft one of the trophies used at the Super Bowl. He also for a time worked at Tiffany & Co. and did restoration work on silver pieces for Sotheby's and Christie's. He later held his wedding in Scotland, at which he became inspired by the bagpipes played there to begin making bagpipes himself using his education and experience he gained as a craftsman. This first began as a hobby but grew in passion as MacLellan believed the bagpipes otherwise being sold in New York were mostly cheap and inauthentic.

== Early career ==
In 1988, MacLellan left silversmithing to pursue making bagpipes full time under the name "MacLellan Bagpipes". His pieces reportedly stood out as they often came decorated with designs based on historic bagpipe patterns, a niche he credited to his education in art. Around 2000 while still in New Jersey, he began to grow in popularity after at least one of his bagpipes was used by the Niagara Regional Police Pipe Band. MacLellan then moved to Summerville, South Carolina, around 2004, where he set up a small workshop. While in South Carolina, MacLellan was one of only five or six bagpipe makers in the United States. MacLellan reportedly worked 60 hours a week to support the business, with the bagpipes he made costing anywhere between $1,500 and $6,000, depending on the materials used. Also during this time, The Regimental Band and Pipes based out of The Citadel college in Charleston, used one of MacLellan's bagpipes at the Royal Edinburgh Military Tattoo, a month-long music festival in Scotland.

MacLellan then moved to Monroe, North Carolina, no later than September 2014. Here, his workshop began to produce around ninety bagpipes each year. While in North Carolina, he found himself enjoying playing for the Raleigh Pipe Band, a bagpipe band located in the state capital of Raleigh, and soon became a member. Due to a lack of interest from Raleigh, however, MacLellan was unable to move his business to the city but desired to still move close to it as to continue working with the Pipe Band. Sometime after September 2018, MacLellan then began considering Zebulon as a potential location to move to after a successful performance at the Olde Raleigh Distillery in the town, after which an employee under MacLellan, Joe Brady, noticed the building next door was vacant and recommended it. The town furthermore was only a short distance from Raleigh and was found to be more inviting.

== MacLellan Bagpipes ==
MacLellan Bagpipes
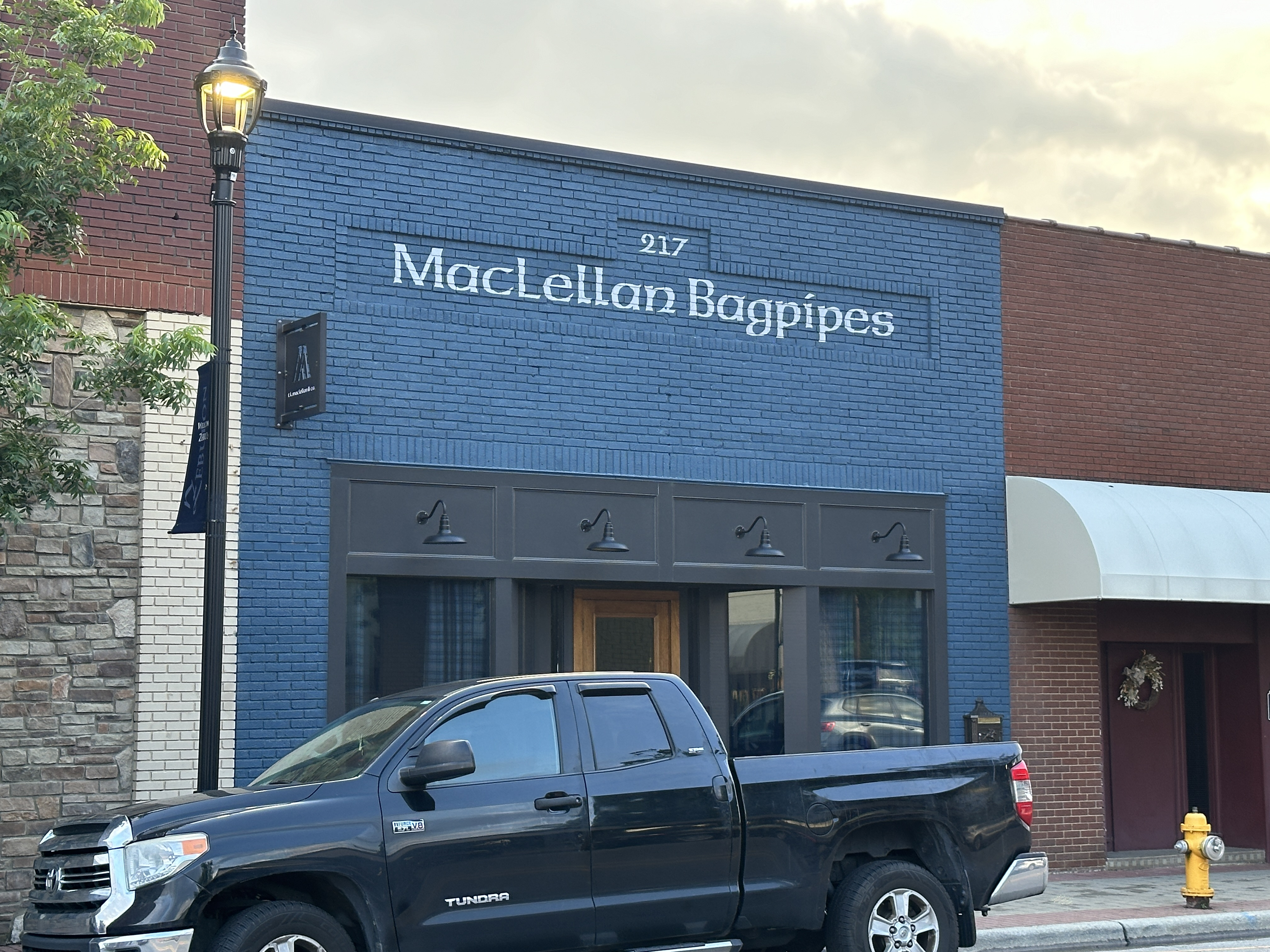
- The storefront in Zebulon in May 2024
- Industry: Bagpipe making
- Predecessor: Three prior businesses around the U.S. under the same name since 1988
- Founded: March 1993; 33 years ago
- Founder: Roddy MacLellan
- Headquarters: Zebulon, North Carolina, United States
- Area served: Worldwide
- Products: Bagpipe and its accessories
- Owner: Roddy MacLellan
- Number of employees: 1+
- 35°49′21.4″N 78°18′49.2″W
- Website: maclellanbagpipes.com

In March 2023, the current iteration of MacLellan's bagpipe-making business MacLellan Bagpipes was founded in Zebulon. The business is the only one in North America to make, sell, and teach how to play bagpipes. Despite the opening of the business being delayed because of the COVID-19 pandemic, and likewise less sales from his Monroe workshop leading up to the move, the more central location saw MacLellan's productivity increase to around 120 bagpipes each year, up from the 90 he was producing in Monroe. Despite the town having no prior bagpiping history, the move to Zebulon turned the town into what was referred to by The News & Observer as "Bagpiping Mecca".

The business's bagpipes are made primarily using African blackwood collected from Tanzania, which is then brought to either Germany or the United Kingdom, where it is purchased from the UK. Cocobolo wood from Central America, moose antlers, and other less traditional materials are also used in bagpipe making when approved by their respective CITES permits. The wood is then let to dry for months to a year. From there, a lathe in the workshop is used to carve out the pieces of the bagpipe including its drones and pipes. Delrin, a type of plastic, is often used for the drones for its structural benefits. Any metalwork needed is additionally made in the workshop often using silver or aluminum. When finished, the bagpipes are sold worldwide, with each costing anywhere between $2,000 and $9,000, depending on materials used. The business reportedly can produce a bagpipe in one week or longer; however, it had a waitlist of eight months in 2023. Training new employees in the craft was regarded as one of the main reasons which prevented MacLellan from wanting to retire.

For the 2024 Loch Norman Highland Games, a Scottish festival in Huntersville, North Carolina, an African blackwood chanter made by the business was used as an overall winner prize. In 2023, MacLellan Bagpipes was named a finalist for small businesses in the "Coolest Thing Made in N.C." annual online competition run by the North Carolina Chamber of Commerce.

== Personal life ==
MacLellan was born in Glasgow in either 1955 or 1956, as he was reported to be 58 in an interview on September 18, 2014. He is married and has a family. In response to the 2014 Scottish independence referendum, MacLellan commented "The heart says 'yes' but the mind says 'no'" but expressed gratitude on the peacefulness and democratic process in which it was taking place.

== See also ==
- List of bagpipe makers
