= Zebulon, North Carolina =

Town in North Carolina, US

- Town
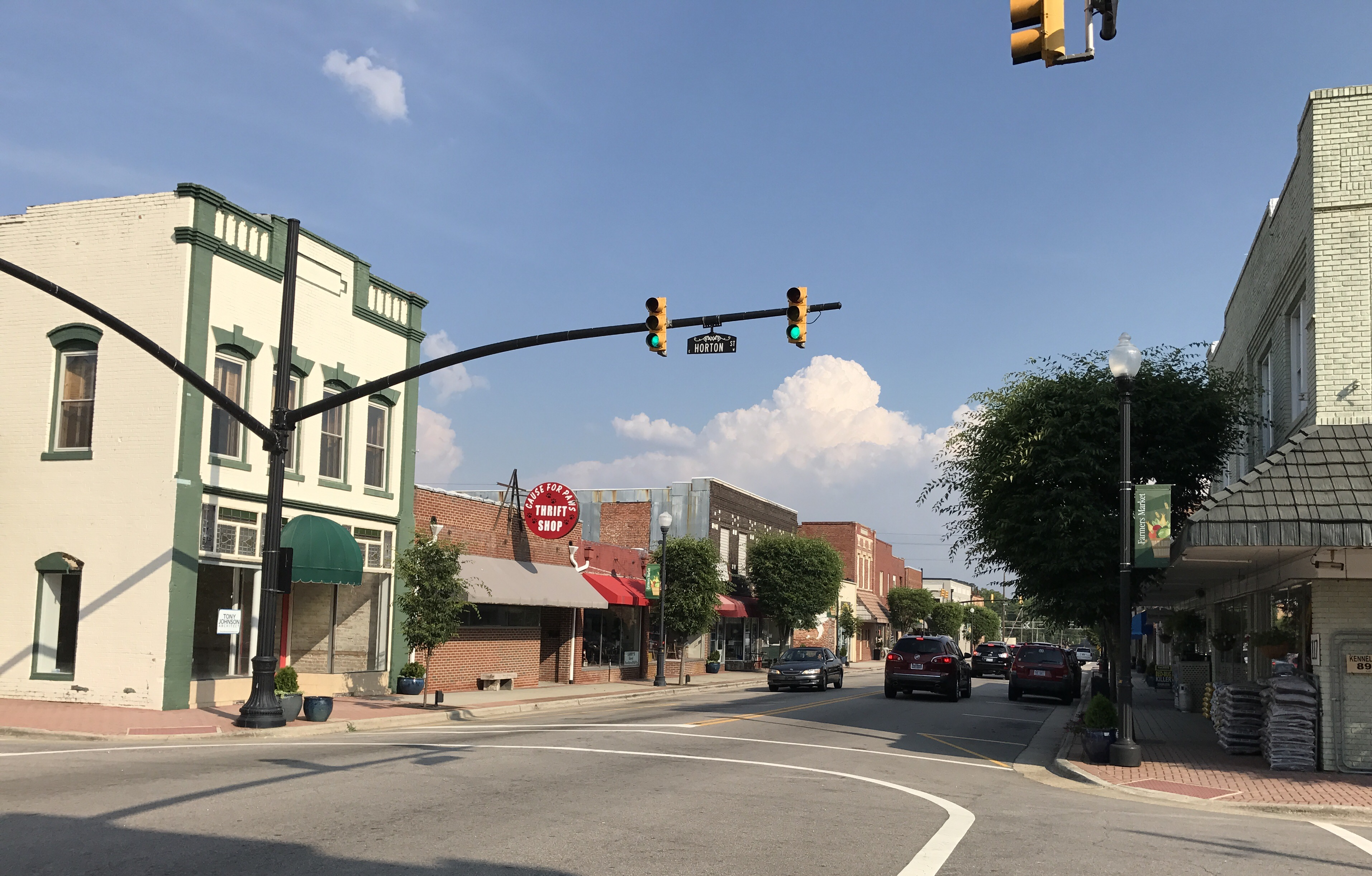
- Downtown Zebulon at the intersection of Arendell Avenue and Horton Street

- Flag Seal
- Motto: "The Town of Friendly People"
- Location in Wake County and the state of North Carolina.
- Coordinates: 35°49′50″N 78°18′54″W
- Country: United States
- State: North Carolina
- Counties: Wake, Johnston (partial), Nash (partial), Franklin (partial)
- Incorporated: 1907
- Named for: Zebulon Baird Vance

Government
  - Mayor: Glenn York

Area
  - Total: 6.12 sq mi (15.84 km^{2})
  - Land: 6.09 sq mi (15.77 km^{2})
  - Water: 0.031 sq mi (0.08 km^{2})
- Elevation: 322 ft (98 m)

Population (2020)
  - Total: 6,903
  - Density: 1,134.0/sq mi (437.85/km^{2})
- Demonym: Zebulonian
- Time zone: UTC−5 (Eastern (EST))
  - Summer (DST): UTC−4 (EDT)
- ZIP code: 27597
- Area code: 919
- FIPS code: 37-76220
- GNIS feature ID: 2406928
- Website: www.townofzebulon.org

Zebulon (/ˈzɛbjulən/ ZEB-yoo-luhn) is the easternmost town in Wake County, North Carolina, United States. The population was 6,903 at the 2020 census. Zebulon is part of the Research Triangle metropolitan region. In May 2022, Zebulon was ranked North Carolina's second fastest growing town, only behind neighboring Wendell.

== History ==
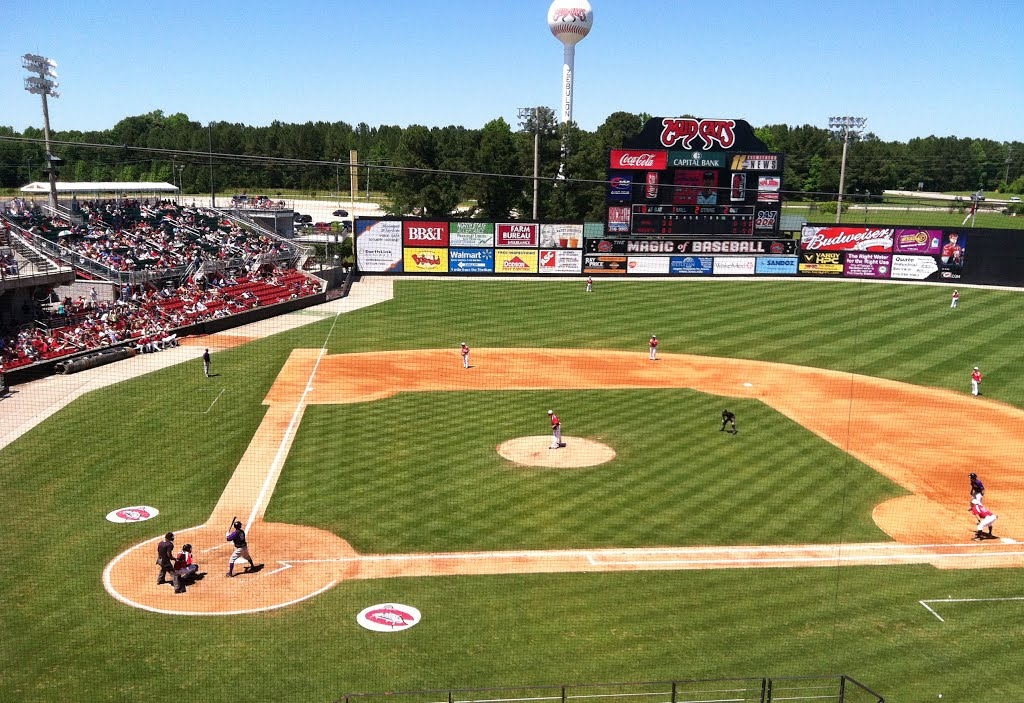
Five County Stadium in Zebulon

In 1906, the Raleigh and Pamlico Sound Railroad Company decided to bring the railroad through the Whitley and Horton family farms in eastern Wake County. Edgar B. Barbee and Falconer B. Arendell organized the Zebulon Company for development that same year. The company received its charter on February 15, 1906. Shortly thereafter, they began to divide up their 49 acres (20 ha) into lots, blocks, streets and avenues. On February 16, 1907, the town was officially recognized as Zebulon, North Carolina. The town was named after Zebulon Baird Vance, the Governor of North Carolina during the American Civil War. The first election was held in May 1907, and the first elected mayor was Thomas J. Horton.

In 1997 Zebulon annexed the neighboring community of Wakefield, increasing the total area inside the corporate limits to 2,115 acres (8.56 km^{2}) and the population to 3,908. The population had grown to 6,903 by 2020.

There are four properties in Zebulon listed on the National Register of Historic Places: Wakelon School, Bennett Bunn Plantation, the George and Neva Barbee House, and the Zebulon Historic District.

== Law and government ==
Zebulon follows the council-manager government form of government, in which the elected governing body is responsible for legislative functions such as establishing policy, passing local ordinances, adopting annual budget, and developing an overall town vision. The council then appoints a professional town manager who is responsible for overseeing administrative operations, implementing policies, and advising the council.

Zebulon is governed by a five-member Board of Commissioners and a mayor. Three members are elected in one year and the two remaining members and the mayor are elected two years later. The mayor, as the principal elected official of the town, provides leadership to the governing body and the community and presides over Board meetings.

As the legislative body of Zebulon, the Board's primary responsibilities include establishing town policies and adopting an annual budget. Local municipality budgets for each fiscal year must be adopted by June 30. The budget for the fiscal year runs from July 1 to June 30.

Current Board members are Shannon Baxter, Quentin Miles, Beverly Wall Clark, Amber Davis, Jessica Harrison, and Mayor Glenn York. The Interim Town Manager is Taiwo Jaiyeoba.

== Geography ==
According to the United States Census Bureau, the town has a total area of 4.2 square miles (10.8 km^{2}), of which 4.1 square miles (10.7 km^{2}) is land and 0.02 square miles (0.06 km^{2}), or 0.57%, is water.

Zebulon is located in the northeast central region of North Carolina, where the North American Piedmont and Atlantic Coastal Plain regions meet. This area is known as the "Fall Line" because it marks the elevation inland at which waterfalls begin to appear in creeks and rivers. Its central Piedmont location situates Zebulon about three hours by car west of Atlantic Beach, North Carolina, and four hours east of the Great Smoky Mountains.

Zebulon is located on an elevated portion of land between the Little River and Moccasin Creek.

=== Climate ===
Zebulon has a cool subtropical climate or warm temperate climate, with moderate temperatures in the spring, and fall. Summers are typically hot with high humidity. Winter highs generally range in the low 50s°F (10 to 13 °C) with lows in the low-to-mid 30s°F (-2 to 2 °C), although an occasional 60 °F (15 °C) or warmer winter day is not uncommon. Spring and fall days usually reach the low-to-mid 70s°F (low 20s°C), with lows at night in the lower 50s°F (10 to 14 °C). Summer daytime highs often reach the upper 80s to low 90s°F (29 to 35 °C). The rainiest months are July and August.

== Demographics ==
Historical population
Census	Pop.	Note	%±
1910	482		—
1920	953		97.7%
1930	860		−9.8%
1940	1,070		24.4%
1950	1,378		28.8%
1960	1,534		11.3%
1970	1,839		19.9%
1980	2,055		11.7%
1990	3,173		54.4%
2000	4,046		27.5%
2010	4,433		9.6%
2020	6,903		55.7%
2025 (est.)	11,933	▲	72.9%
U.S. Decennial Census

=== 2020 census ===
As of the 2020 census, Zebulon had a population of 6,903. The median age was 35.8 years. 27.4% of residents were under the age of 18, and 13.6% were 65 years of age or older. For every 100 females, there were 83.3 males; for every 100 females age 18 and over, there were 77.5 males age 18 and over.

97.0% of residents lived in urban areas, while 3.0% lived in rural areas.

There were 2,508 households in Zebulon, of which 39.5% had children under the age of 18 living in them. Of all households, 42.7% were married-couple households, 14.9% were households with a male householder and no spouse or partner present, and 35.8% were households with a female householder and no spouse or partner present. About 25.0% of all households were made up of individuals, and 9.7% had someone living alone who was 65 years of age or older.

There were 2,682 housing units, of which 6.5% were vacant. The homeowner vacancy rate was 2.0%, and the rental vacancy rate was 5.2%.

Zebulon racial composition
Race	Number	Percentage
White (non-Hispanic)	2,554	37.0%
Black or African American (non-Hispanic)	2,741	39.71%
Native American	29	0.42%
Asian	78	1.13%
Other/Mixed	364	5.27%
Hispanic or Latino	1,137	16.47%

=== Demographic estimates ===
Similar to other towns in eastern Wake County, the town recorded a population growth of 13% in the 2020 United States census, making it the second fastest-growing town in the state. In August 2023, the town was reported to have reached 10,000 population, according to an estimate by the town's planning department. The sudden growth was attributed to its relative affordability in living, incentives for new businesses, and an increased focus on development and expansion.

== Economy ==
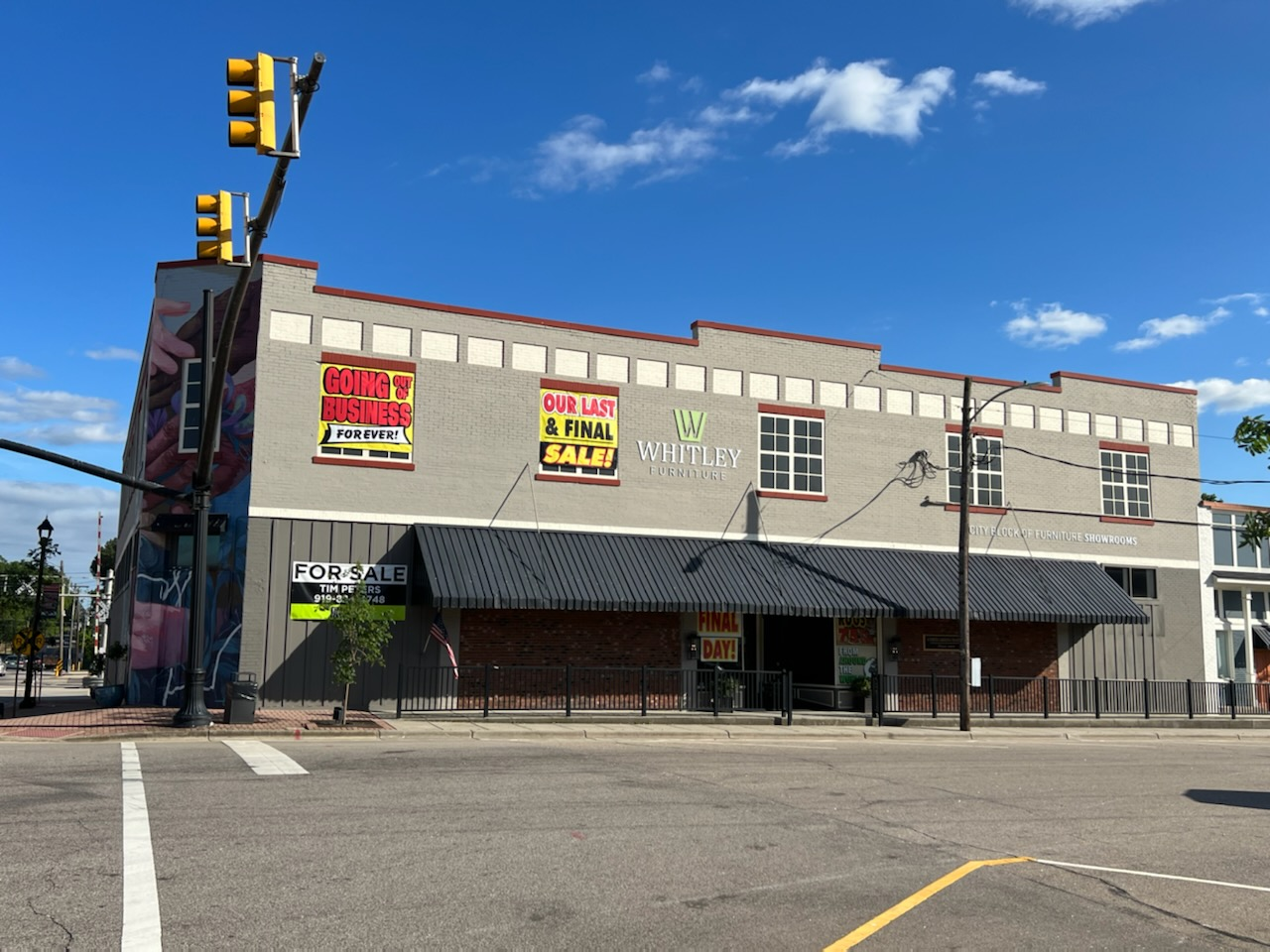
The main building of Whitley Furniture Galleries in 2022

The town's largest employers include GlaxoSmithKline, US Foods, BB&T, Nomaco, and Vinventions, but is home to a number of small businesses as well. Until closing in 2022, Whitley Furniture Galleries located downtown was historically one of the largest employers in the town and had the largest furniture stock in the Research Triangle upon closing. Olde Raleigh Distillery, opened in 2021, was awarded "Best Micro Distillery Whiskey" in the U.S. during the 2023 International Whisky Competition. MacLellan Bagpipes, opened in 2023, became the only business in North America to make, sell, and teach how to play bagpipes, and one of the few locations offering custom bagpipes in the world.

In addition to these businesses, WakeMed operates the Zebulon/Wendell Outpatient and Skilled Nursing Facility, a satellite facility for the hospital's primary location in Raleigh. In rural areas of the town, agriculture is still an important aspect of the local economy with products such as cotton, tobacco, wheat, corn and soybeans being grown.

== Education ==
The town is home to four public schools: including Corinth-Holders Elementary, Wakelon Elementary, Zebulon Elementary, Zebulon Middle. There is also one charter school, East Wake Academy (K-12), and one private school, Heritage Christian Academy.

Higher education is provided by Wake Technical Community College.

== Parks and recreation ==
The town has six public parks and a community center. The largest park, Zebulon Community Park, contains a number of trails and playing fields. Other parks include:

- Little River Dam and Park – natural park situated along the Little River with a dam and waterfall; picnic areas and hiking trails
- Gill Street Park – basketball courts, playgrounds, and picnic areas
- Wakelon Elementary School Park – two multipurpose fields, picnic shelter
- Whitley Park – picnic areas, two playgrounds, tennis courts, benches and various shelters
- Zebulon Elementary School Park – two baseball fields, picnic shelter, soccer field, playground, grass volleyball court

== Transportation ==
=== Passenger ===
- Air: Zebulon is served by Raleigh-Durham International Airport, which is located in northwestern Wake County off I-40 and I-540.
- Interstate highway: Zebulon is located halfway between I-95 and I-40. I-95 is accessible by driving east on US 64. I-40 is accessible by driving west on US 64/264 (Knightdale Bypass) to the I-440 beltline and heading south.
- Zebulon is not served directly by passenger trains. Amtrak has stops in Raleigh, Rocky Mount and Selma.
- Local bus: The Triangle Transit Authority operates buses that serve the region and connect to municipal bus systems in Raleigh, Durham, and Chapel Hill.

=== Roads ===
- US 64 and US 264 split in Zebulon. East of Zebulon they provide access to the Outer Banks, US 64 via Rocky Mount, and US 264 via Wilson. West of Zebulon the two roads remain merged as the Knightdale Bypass which connects eastern Wake County to Raleigh. There is also a Business US 64 which connects Zebulon, Wendell, and Knightdale and represents several former alignments of US 64. Interstate 540 also connects 64 Business, 264 Bypass, I-440 and I-40.
- NC 96 is a primary north–south highway through the town. It connects Zebulon to Rolesville to the north and Selma to the south.
- NC 39 is another north–south highway that connects Selma to Louisburg and Henderson. It passes to the east of Zebulon near Five County Stadium.
- NC 97 is a former alignment of US 64. It parallels US 64 and connects several small unincorporated communities along its route.

== Notable people ==
- Clifton Daniel, editor of the New York Times and son-in-law of President Harry Truman
- Nick Driver, singer-songwriter
- Marty Gearheart, member of the West Virginia House of Delegates
- J. T. Knott, politician who served as a Wake County Commissioner
- Jim Pearce, former MLB player for the Washington Senators and Cincinnati Redlegs
- Johnny Perry, professional strongman competitor

== Gallery ==
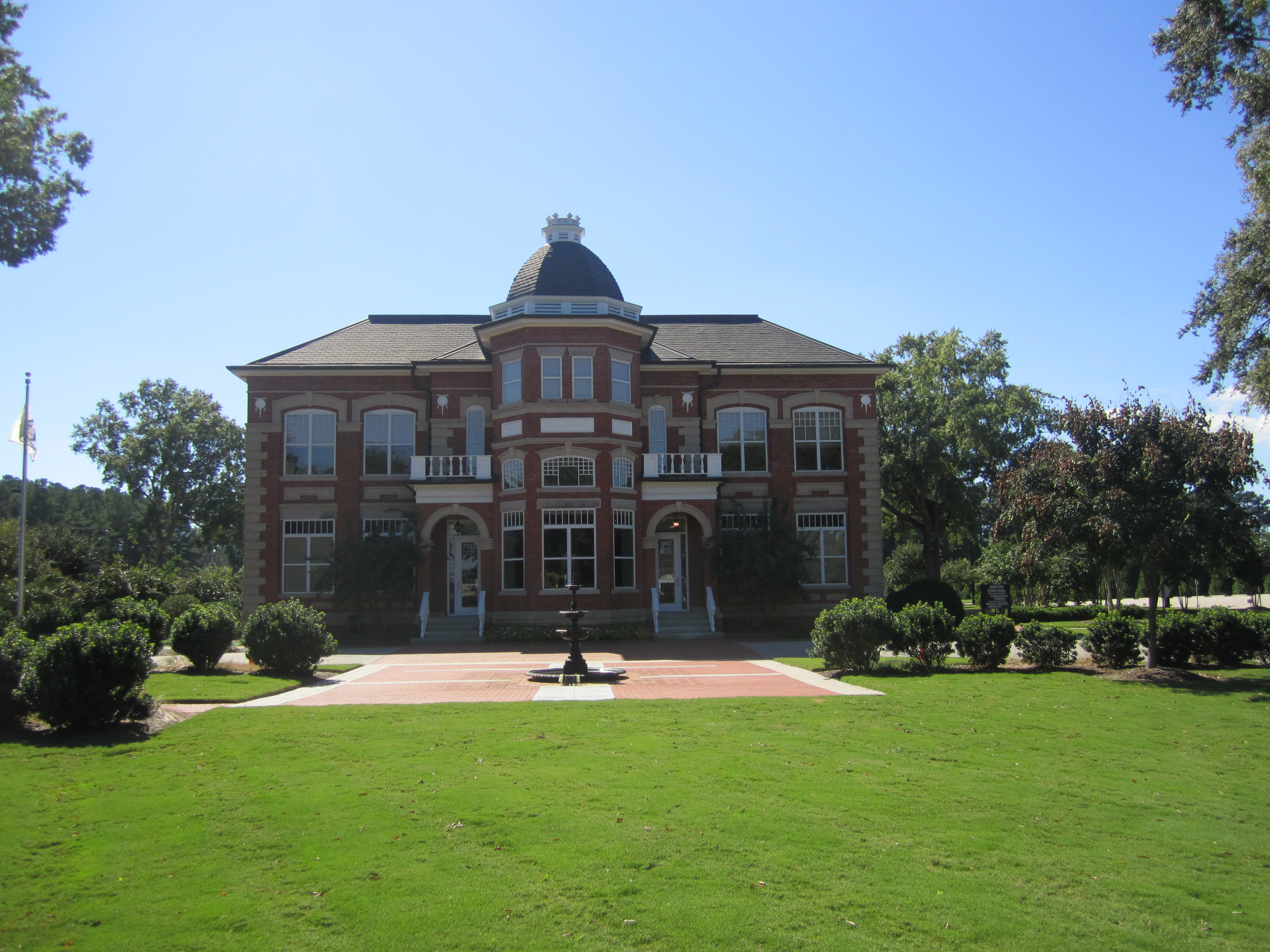
Zebulon town hall

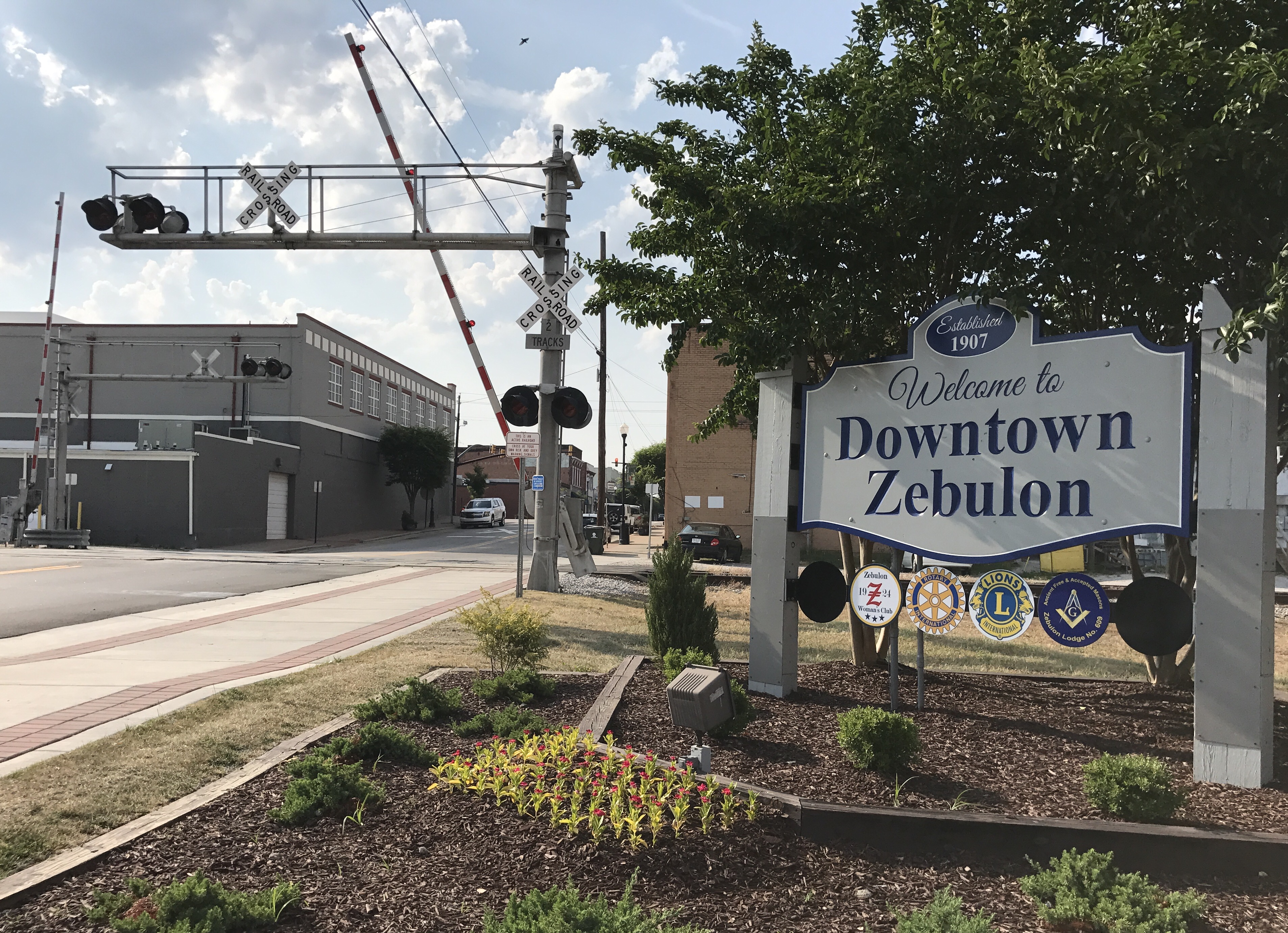
Welcome to Downtown Zebulon; sign

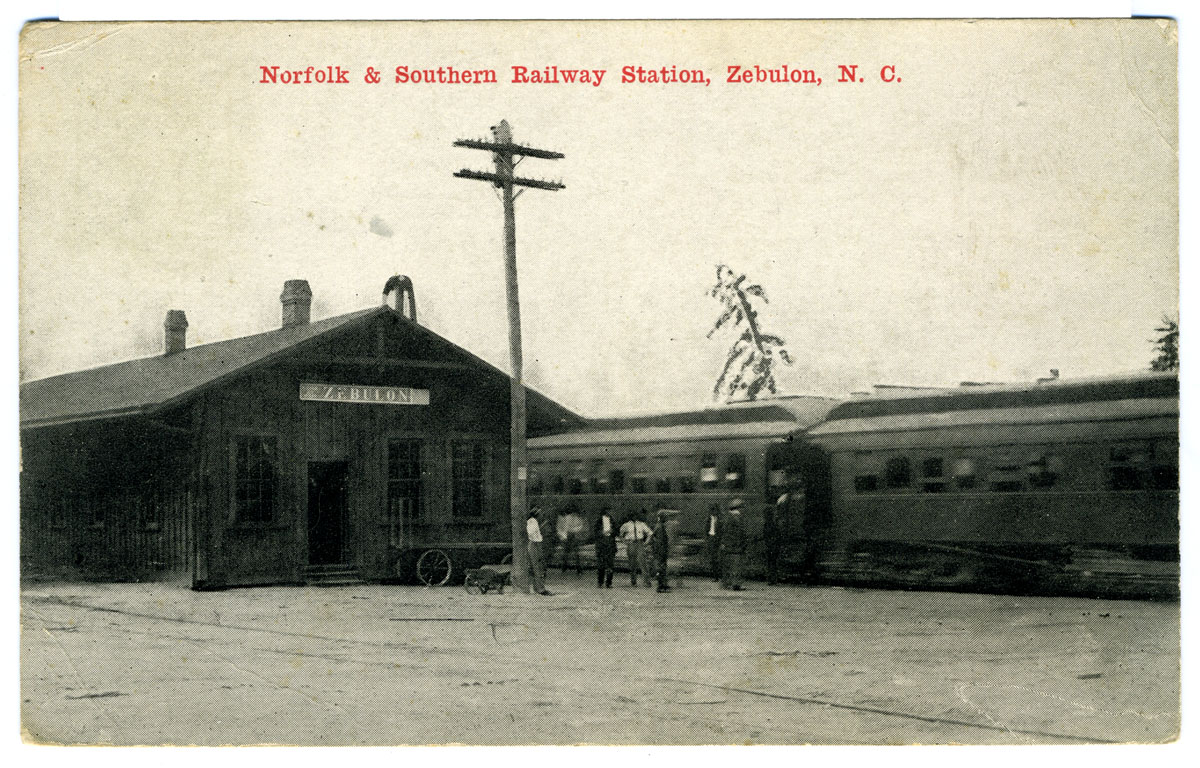
Norfolk & Southern rail station

Downtown tobacco auction advertisement
