= Patsy Brown =

Patrick A. 'Patsy' Brown (1872 in Ireland – 1958 in Boston, Massachusetts, United States) was an Irish-American maker of the uilleann pipes. Originally from Killorglin, County Kerry, Ireland, he emigrated to the United States in 1892, making his home first in Chicago and then the Dorchester neighborhood of Boston, Massachusetts. He may have made a living as a bricklayer and/or electrician. He made uilleann pipes on a part-time basis, out of his cellar, so his output was not huge, but his style is very distinctive. He may have made sets from about 1910 until his death in 1958. It is believed that, like many Irish musicians of his time, he played for dancers in the clubs around Dudley Square, Dorchester.

Patsy's house at 43 Clayton St., Dorchester, MA.

His earlier work was styled after that of the Taylor brothers, with broad rectangular keys along the back of the chanter, operated by small touches that wrapped around to the front of the chanter. The regulator keys at first resembled the Taylors' design, though Brown mounted them in wooden blocks, rather than between metal plates, as the Taylors did. His keywork is generally nickel-plated brass, though some are chromed (some chanters have both nickel- and chrome-plating ).

There is a story that he obtained the ivory used in the mounts from the elephant keepers at Boston's Franklin Park Zoo. They would trim the tip of the tusks, to make the ends blunt for the safety of the keepers and the other elephants. Those ends wound up in Patsy's hands, and ultimately in his pipes.

In later years his style changed to a more hybrid style, with Böhm-style keywork on all the holes at the front of the chanter, but broad, flat, Taylor-style keys on the holes at the back of the chanter. There is some speculation that he may have repaired classical flutes on a part-time basis too, which might have led him to experiment. Another theory is that it was simply an inventive way of dealing with the problems of age: arthritic fingers had an easier time achieving closure with keys. On some chanters, the keys are applied in the same manner as one would find on a flute: all of them pivot about a common rod that runs parallel to the chanter. On others, the style is really unique: each key pivots about its own rod, held in place by its own two posts, mounted above the tone hole, but transverse to the chanter. A number of his chanters are known, and not all of them share this distinctive style.

He is believed to have made only concert-pitch sets. It appears that he always used a popping valve on his chanters.

Other makers in the Boston area, who overlapped with Brown to some degree were Ned White of Roxbury, and Green. White's style was even closer than Brown's to that of the Taylor brothers, which may indicate that he was older and had personal contact with them. He is mentioned in O'Neill's Irish Minstrels. Some of his sets are still extant.

It is reported that Patsy Brown taught Seán McAloon to make reeds, by correspondence.
