= English bagpipes =

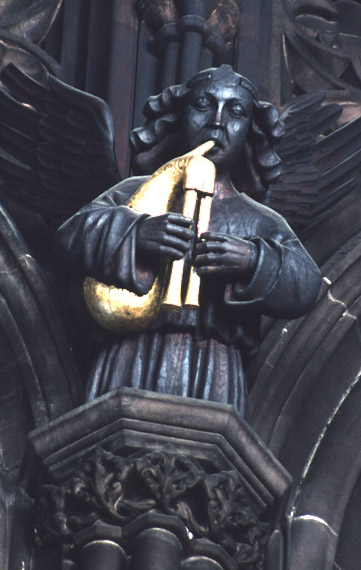
15th-century carving of bagpiper in the Manchester Cathedral

When bagpipes arrived in England is unknown. There is some evidence to suggest Anglo-Saxon times; however, the oldest confirmed proof of the existence of bagpipes anywhere in the world comes from three separate sources in the 13th century. Two of these are English, namely the Tenison Marginalie Psalter from Westminster and an entry into the accounts books of Edward I of England recording the purchase of a set of bagpipes, and the third is from the Cantigas del Santa Maria published in Spain. From the 14th century onwards, bagpipes start to appear in the historical records of European countries; however, half the mentions come from England, which suggests that bagpipes were more common in England.

Bagpipes are mentioned in English literature as early as The Canterbury Tales by Geoffrey Chaucer, written between the 1380s and 1390s. Writing in the Prologue about the Miller, the lines read:

A baggepype wel coude he blowe and sowne,
And ther-with-al he broghte us out of towne.

Stone and wood carvings of bagpipes of many different types began to appear in English cathedrals and churches beginning in the 14th century; examples of such carvings may be found in Cornwall, Dorset, Devon, Herefordshire, Yorkshire, Cambridgeshire, Manchester, Norfolk, and Shropshire.

Bagpipes increased in popularity across England and Europe throughout the 15th to 17th century. During the Baroque era the same technological increase that allowed the development of Baroque instruments was applied to the bagpipes and they became more sophisticated too, which along with a decrease in size and volume of pipes, small parlour pipes becoming preferred, the crude great pipes of medieval times died out. By the 17th century the pastoral pipes had become the most popular pipes in England and were exported to Ireland by Protestant settlers. During the 19th century Europe (except Scotland) experienced a massive loss of popularity in the piping and their piping traditions died out, only to be reborn in the 20th century.

The only surviving unbroken English piping tradition is that of the Northumbrian smallpipes, which are used in Northumberland and Durham. In addition, the related border pipe traditional of Northern England and Lowland Scotland has undergone a revival.

== Anglo-Saxon bagpipes ==
Bagpipes are mentioned in ancient Greece and then Rome, but disappear from history until reappearing in medieval Spain and England and quickly spreading across parts of medieval Europe, with one exception. Currently the only known possible Dark Age usage of bagpipes is in England. The Exeter Book of Riddles, a collection of manuscripts from across England written in the Old English language contains a riddle where the answer is, Bagpipes. Also a number of Anglo-Saxon musical instruments were uncovered at Hungate in York, among them a reed pipe. It has been proposed by researchers it may be a bagpipe chanter. However there is no way of telling for sure as other instruments such as bladder pipes used reed pipes as well.

== Regional pipes ==
- Lancashire: The Lancashire bagpipe or Lancashire greatpipe has been attested in literature, and commentators have noticed that the Lancashire bagpipe was also believed proof against witchcraft.
- Leicestershire: Numerous reproductions of the Leicestershire smallpipes have been made by pipemaker Julian Goodacre since the late 20th century.
- Lincolnshire: The Lincolnshire bagpipes were mentioned in literature since the time of Shakespeare, and in 2010 sets were re-created based on artistic depictions found in Lincolnshire churches.
- Yorkshire: The Yorkshire bagpipes are attested in literature, but are currently extinct.
- Worcestershire: The Worcestershire bagpipe has likewise been attested in literature, with the men of that county noted as famed for their love of piping. The instrument is currently extinct.

== Controversy over the validity of "reconstruction" ==
Reconstruction of extinct bagpipes is common in many countries, Germany, Spain, Italy, Scotland, Wales, Ireland, Greece, Macedonia and England all have pipemakers and playing communities based around ancient bagpipes. Many of these groups are early musicians or archaeomusicians attempting to gain understanding of ancient music through scientific experimentation.

Some British pipers and pipemakers, such as Julian Goodacre, have "reconstructed" several types of claimed extinct bagpipes, based on iconography and inconclusive textual clues. Other enthusiasts dispute these findings, as detailed in James Merryweather's article "Regional Bagpipes: History or Bunk?"

While dismissing much research as optimistic interpretations of the source materials, Merryweather claimed to have found indisputable evidence of a bagpiper in Liverpool in 1571. Per Merryweather, the records of the Liverpool Wait makes a single mention of one "henrie halewod bagpiper".

== Other bagpipes of the British Isles undergoing reconstruction ==
- Cornish bagpipes
- Welsh pipes (claimed physical examples survive from the 17th and 18th centuries)
- Zetland pipes
- Scottish smallpipes

== Sources ==
- Stewart, Pete (2001). Robin With the Bagpipe: The English Bagpipe and Its Music. Ashby Parva: White House Tune Books. ISBN 0-907772-52-8.
- English Manuscript Studies, 1100-1700 - Google Books Result
- JSTOR: Pipers' Pabulum
- JSTOR: Music in the World's Proverbs
- JSTOR: Two-Chanter Bagpipes in England
- JSTOR: Chaucer's Millers and Their Bagpipes
- The Witches of Lancashire - Google Books Result
- Lancashire - Records of Early English Drama
- Notes on Lancashire parish Registers
- The Fiddler’s Companion, Andrew Kuntz
- R D Cannon, The Bagpipe in Northern England, Folk Musical Journal Number 2 (1971)
- Alfred Welby The Lincolnshire Bagpipe Oxford University Press, 1930.
- M.H. Dobbs The Lincolnshire Bagpipe Oxford University Press, 1930.
- Stephen Taggart The Lincolnshire Bagpipes Early Music, Vol. 4, No. 3 (July 1976), pp. 363–365.
- Franz Montgomery The Musical Instruments in "The Canterbury Tales". The Musical Quarterly 1931 XVII(4):439-448; doi:10.1093/mq/XVII.4.439

History and Origin of the Bagpipes The History & Origin of the Bagpipes - YouTube

=== Historical images ===
- Bagpipe Carvings
- Bagpipe Carvings
- Bagpipe Paintings: The Bagpiper of Exeter
- Bagpipe Paintings
