= Lancashire bagpipe =

The Lancashire bagpipe or Lancashire greatpipe has been attested in literature, and commentators have noticed that the Lancashire bagpipe was also believed proof against witchcraft.

As in neighbouring Yorkshire, the Union pipes in Lancashire survived into the 19th century. It was popular enough there to warrant an entry in the 1881 Ab o'th Yates dialect dictionary - "Tweedler: a man who plays the Union pipes is called a "Tweedler". Lowland and Border Pipers' Society note that recently as 1960 a folklore collector was informed by an elderly lady in Barrowford that her father had played the union pipes.

== Historical attestation ==
- In James Shirley's 1634 masque, The Triumph of Peace, the procession to Whitehall was led by Thomas Basset on horseback, playing the Lancashire bagpipe.
- Aphra Behn's Sir Patient Fancy (1678) mentions: "Not so joyful neither Sir, when you shall know Poor Gillian 's dead, My little gray Mare, thou knew'st her mun, Zoz 'thas made me as Melancholy as the Drone of a Lancashire Bagpipe"
- Ralph Thoresby, a topographer, wrote in 1702: "got little rest, the music and Lancashire bagpipes having continued the whole night."

▪ Cervantes, Don Quixote, translated by P.A Motteux (1712) (Explains), Zamora is a city in Spain, famous for that sort of music, as Lancashire is in England for the bagpipe.

== See also ==
- List of bagpipes
- List of bagpipers
- List of pipe makers
- Glossary of bagpipe terms
