= Hugh Robertson (instrument maker) =

- Born: c 1730; Scotland
- Died: 1822; CastleHill, Edinburgh
- Occupations: Instrument maker, wood turner, ivory turner
- Years active: 1765–1821

Hugh Robertson (1730–1822) was a Scottish wood and ivory turner and a master crafter of woodwind instruments such as pastoral pipes, union pipes, and great Highland bagpipes.

== Biography ==
Robertson was born in 1730 in Scotland although the exact date is not known. Possibly born in Edinburgh where he lived and worked for the majority of his life till his retirement at the age of 90 in 1821. Hugh Robertson is noted as one of the earliest professional Scottish pipe makers of the 18th century, in a career spanning 58 years. Robertson pipes are hallmarked from 1765, and by 1775 and he is recorded in the directory of tradesmen as a ‘pipe maker’ trading from Castle Hill Edinburgh. Robertson had a wide and highly crafted repertoire of a maker of great Highland bagpipes, pastoral pipes sometimes termed in Edinburgh as the "flat-set of pipes" and Union pipes.

== Robertson instruments ==
A set of 18th-century union pipes in boxwood, ivory and brass mounts with two regulators and drone cut-off switch; by Hugh Robertson

The first commercial bagpipe makers were prior to 1750 in Edinburgh and Glasgow and skilled musical instrument makers were often wood turners by profession, and began to craft instrument to a design individual to the makers style and innovations. Several well established 18th-century instrument makers are recorded at this time; i.e. Donald MacDonald of Edinburgh and Malcolm MacGregor of Glasgow diversifying and making a variety of pipes. Robertson was no exception and in his designs, added decoration of 'beading' and 'combing' style on Highland bagpipes which in turn was adopted as standard by the late 18th century and has remained unchanged since then. He crafted the Edinburgh prize Great Highland pipe of 1802, which was later played at the battle of waterloo by piper John Buchanan, pipe major of the Black Watch.

Due to the popularity of plays and playlets of the time and interests and patronage of amateur gentleman pipers of the 18th and 19th centuries, master craftsman like Robertson crafted high quality instruments including bellows blown pastoral and union pipes. Predominately more examples survive in considerable quantity bearing the Robertson hallmark, more-so than his contemporaries (e.g. James Kenna) and in surviving numbers represents the most of his production and contribution to the development of this genre. Using native hardwoods such as laburnum, boxwood and elder, Robertson diversified in his materials and workshop was well situated to obtain raw materials from ships trading into the river Clyde and Forth, and tropical hardwoods including cocus wood from the Caribbean and African Continent, suitable for turning into musical instruments, that were preferred for bagpipe making.

Ever the innovator, he was not restricted to the sole use of hardwoods alone, and experimented in ivory sets of bass, baritone and tenor drones in an ivory common stock with characteristic "lotus-top" style of tuning. Many of the surviving Robertson pastoral and union pipe sets displayed a U-bend in the bass drone; that bends back into the stock of the instrument, to reduce the length and stretch to tune the bass drone. Other modifications of Scottish-made Union pipes of this period, included the addition of a third drone and model the drone stock into a separate chamber for the drone and regulator reeds, instruments of this period regularly attached the regulators above the stock. Robertson attached the regulators to the front of the stock to achieve a better balance or greater volume with double regulator reeds and the drones. Pastoral sets with one or two regulators are common in Robertson’s sets as well as keyed pastoral and shortened union chanters. Such developments were driven by experimentation as musical styles changed, diversifying the instruments by the maker or the particular tastes of the customer. Leading as musical instruments advanced from an open pastoral bagpipe chanter, to a staccato or closed union pipe in the mid-18th century. Robertson was one of the contemporary innovators of the pastoral and union pipes, as with other instrument makers in the mid-18th to 19th centuries across Scotland, England and Ireland. Makers would regularly exchange ideas, innovations and knowledge in the development of these pipes well into the 19th century, as well as their own unique styling and craftsmanship and sophisticated development of the instrument.

== Acclaim and recognition ==
Robertson crafted instruments were popular especially with the gentleman set and crafted the Edinburgh Great Highland prize pipe of 1802 as well as prize pipes for the Highland Society of London between the 1780s and 1820s. The Highland Society of London regularly set up piping competitions and commissioned pipes as prizes from Robertson that were used in annual pageants of Highland culture at the Theatre Royal in Edinburgh. Recognized for his skill and development of the pastoral and union pipes, Robertson was presented a set of union pipes from the Duchess of Northumberland belonging to the famous and somewhat infamous Newcastle upon Tyne piper Jamie Allen.
