= Yorkshire bagpipe =

Musical instrument

The Yorkshire bagpipe is a type of bagpipe once native to the county of Yorkshire in northern England. The instrument is currently extinct, though The Imperial Dictionary of the English Language describes the 'Yorkshire bagpipe' as being familiar in Shakespeare's time. Late attestations of bagpipes in Yorkshire date to the 19th century and resemble the Uilleann Pipes.

Modern researcher Kathleen Scott notes that the instrument was often likened to a sow, but not on the basis of its sound.

When Captain Cook sailed from Whitby in 1776 he took with him a bagpiper to entertain the ship's company. When the explorers landed on the Island of Middleburg they were accorded a state welcome by the local chief; and after the Royal musicians had played, the piper responded with some English airs on his bagpipe.

== Union Pipers ==
The bagpipe survived in Yorkshire until the 19th century as the Union Pipes and appears to have remained commonplace in the remoter Dales. David Hatton (1769–1847), a bagpipe player from Thornton, Yorkshire, is reported to have invented an instrument similar to the Irish bagpipe on which he played with much skill. Perhaps the most notable Union Piper in Yorkshire was Billy Bolton, known as "the Dales Minstrel," died as late as 1881. Bolton played throughout the North and West Ridings, eventually settling in Wharfedale, although he originally hailed from Gilling in Richmondshire.
