= Cauld wind pipes =

Cauld wind pipes is a Scottish term referring to any Scottish bagpipe that is bellows-blown rather than blown with the mouth. Such pipes include:

- Border pipes
- Pastoral pipes
- Scottish smallpipes
