= William Talbot (piper) =

Irish piper

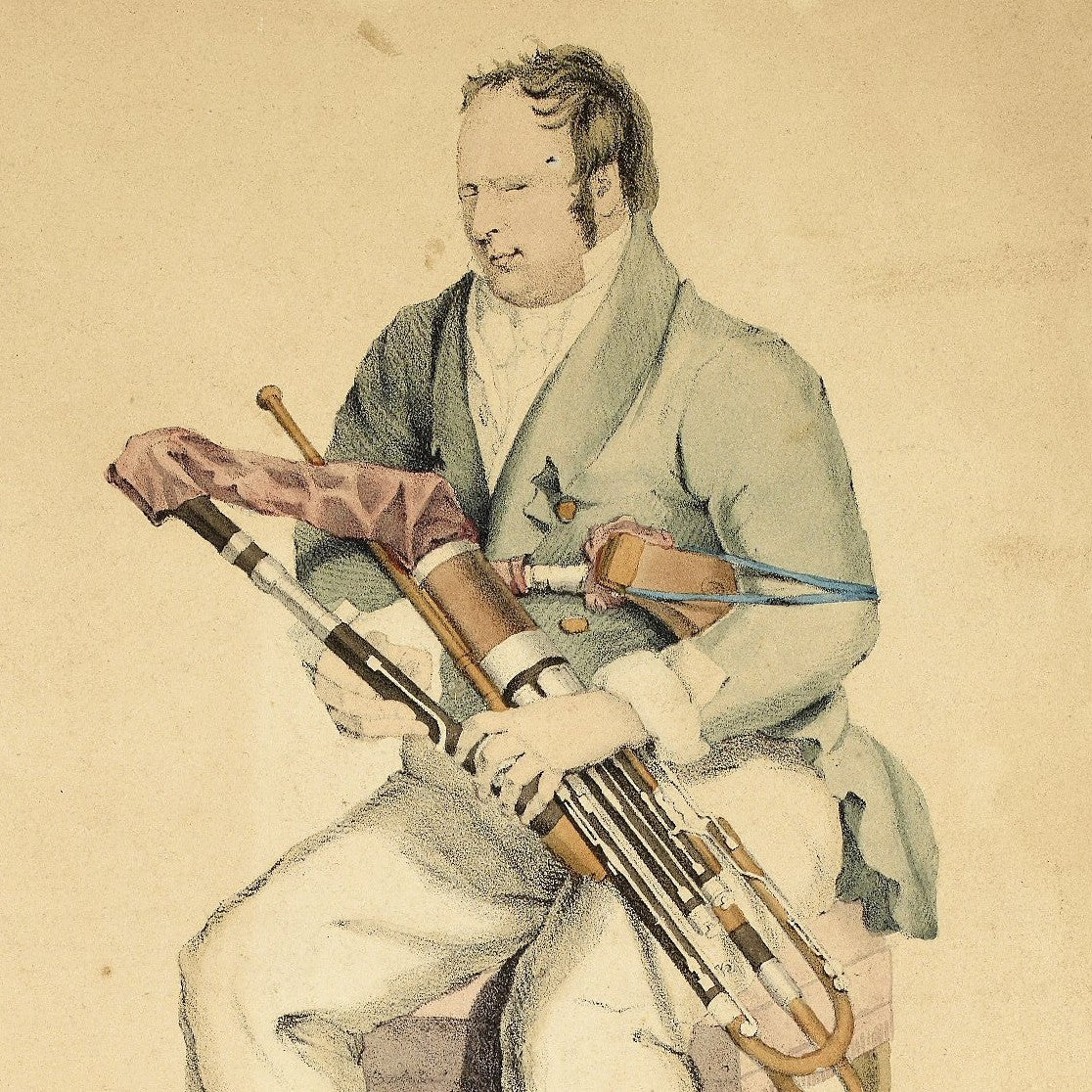
Mr. Talbot, the Celebrated Performer On the Improved Union Pipe

William Talbot was a 19th century player, teacher, repairer and builder of the Irish bagpipes, commonly known as the uilleann pipes, the characteristic national bagpipes of Ireland. In 1821 he played for King George IV at the Dublin Theatre Royal when the King visited Dublin in August 1821. An article in the Dublin Morning Post recorded that, "His Majesty seemed much pleased with Talbot, and applauded him frequently."

== Early life ==
William Talbot was most probably born in Ireland between 1781 and 1792, although no official records of his birth or parentage have been located. The most detailed information about his life comes from a memoir published on 16 December 1820, in the Belfast Commercial Chronicle. In this memoir he stated that he was born in 1781 at Roscrea, County Tipperary, losing his sight aged four years old following infection with smallpox. In later records and census returns, his date of birth was more commonly recorded as circa 1792.

== Early career ==
The first known reference to William Talbot as a piper is in the Freeman’s Journal, an Irish publication, on 3 April 1812 at which time he was known as the "Celebrated Munster Piper" and a "pupil of the late Cramp."

== Later career ==
William Talbot was recorded in newspaper articles and advertisements as a performer until the 1840s, the time of the Great Famine, when Irish bagpipes were diminishing in popularity amongst Irish audiences. He left Ireland and spent his remaining days as an itinerant piper in England and Scotland, dying on 25 March 1876, at Barnhill Poorhouse in Glasgow, Scotland.
