= Glossary of bagpipe terms =

This article defines a number of terms that are exclusive, or whose meaning is exclusive, to piping and pipers.

== A ==
Arm strap
When playing a bagpipe, this attaches the player's arm to the bellows allowing the player to control them.
Argyllshire Gathering
An annual highland games, held at Oban every August which attracts the highest level of competition from around the world. Competitions are held for (i) the Open Piobaireachd, also known as the Clasp; (ii) The Highland Society of London's Gold Medal for Piobaireachd; (iii) The Silver Medal for Piobaireachd; (iv) Former Winners March, Strathspey and Reel Competition, or the Silver Star; (iv) individual event competitions for Grade A & B March, Strathspey, and Reel; and Hornpipe & Jig. Winners of the Gold Medal compete in subsequent years in the Clasp competition. A similar event is held at Inverness, Scotland, (the Northern Meeting) which is held usually two weeks later, in September of each year.
Attack
In pipe band terms, attack describes the process of getting the band from a non-playing state to a playing state. In competition, the attack is often believed to set the scene for the performance that follows and therefore great emphasis is placed on it. The most common method is for the drummers to place two rolls, each lasting for three paces. On the beginning of the second roll, the band strikes in their drones and at the end of the roll, play a two beat introductory note, usually E. The attack is generally considered to have finished when the band has settled into their introductory tune, typically a few bars in.

== B ==
Back D
The note played by the thumb hole of the Uilleann pipe chanter. It has a distinctive haunting quality, subtly different from the rest of the scale.
Backstitching
An ornament in Uilleann piping. The stitch is two staccato gracenotes played above the main note pitch; backstitching is the process of playing several of these stitches on a series of melody notes.
Bag seasoning
Seasoning a bag keeps the leather supple, while allowing it to absorb moisture and keep the bag airtight.
Bag cover
The pipe bag is often covered with a cover, mainly for decoration but possibly also to help the player keep a grip on the bag while playing. Materials can include corduroy, velvet, or wool.
Barking (or popping)
On the Uilleann chanter, the effect created by playing a staccato note while simultaneously lifting and replacing the chanter on the leg. Also known as barking, as this is the sound created.
Biniaouer
Biniaouer means piper in the Breton language.
Binioù
Binioù means bagpipe in the Breton language.
Binioù-bras
Binioù-bras means Great (Highland) Bagpipe in the Breton language. See Pib-Veur.
Binioù-ilin
Binioù-ilin means Uilleann Pipes in the Breton language.
Binioù-kozh
Binioù-kozh is the traditional Breton Bagpipe.
Birl
Onomatopoeic name for a Highland bagpipe embellishment on low A, consisting of two very fast taps or strikes to low G.
Blade
The vibrating element of a bagpipe reed. Reeds can be single or double; generally speaking, chanter reeds are double and drone reeds single. The blade is also known sometimes as a tongue.
Blowpipe
The pipe through which the bag is inflated.
Bombarde
A shawm-like instrument traditionally played in duet with the bagpipe in Brittany.
Bottom D
The lowest note available on an uilleann chanter. Called Bottom D to avoid confusion with the two higher Ds available. It is obtained by lifting the chanter off the leg.
Bridle
(On a double reed for a chanter) A strip of copper about 1/8 to 3/16 in (3.2 to 4.8 mm) wide and 2 in (51 mm) long with slanted edges used to control the aperture of the two blades of a reed. (On a reed single reed for a drone) A few winds of hemp or else some sort of elastic band to control the length and position of the vibrating tongue.
Brien Boru pipes
A 20th century attempt to create an instrument similar to the Highland bagpipe, but with an extended range that could handle popular Irish melodies. Several bands were formed, one or two of which still exist.

== C ==
Canntaireachd
A system of non-lexical vocables, whose purpose is to encapsulate piobaireachd in a form which can be written or spoken while maintaining the precision normally offered only by written music. One of the most important sources in piobaireachd, the Nether Lorn manuscript, is exclusively written in canntaireachd.
Ceòl beag
Literally meaning little music, a Highland bagpiping term referring to, essentially, anything that is not piobaireachd. The term is of relatively recent origin.
Chanter
Cimpoi (or çimpoi)
a Romanian chanter with cylindrical bore and single beating reed. Also has a lower joint usually carved from horn that extends at approximately 45 degrees from the bottom of the chanter.
Closed bore
A chanter with a closed end at the bottom of the chanter. When all the finger holes are closed, the chanter cannot sound, allowing the player to play staccato. The Uilleann pipe achieves the same end by having the player rest the chanter on the leg, with the advantage that the lowest note remains available.
Closed fingering
A fingering system that generally involves only one or two fingers being lifted for any particular note.
College of Piping
Established in 1944 by Seumas MacNeill and Thomas Pearston. Located in Glasgow, Scotland, it published the monthly Piping Times, hosted a small museum, and ran an active and charitable teaching program. From 1953 it published an instructional method titled Tutor for the Highland Bagpipe Part 1, broadly referred to as "The Green Book". The College was acquired by and incorporated into the National Piping Centre in 2018.
Combing and beading
Decorative turnings consisting of more or less tightly spaced narrow circular grooves found on drones, mostly on Great Highland pipes.
Cords
Decorative cords with tassels are used to link or tie the three drones of the Highland bagpipe together.
Cran
An Uilleann piping ornament, consisting of a series of gracenotes of varying pitch over a low note, most commonly bottom D.
Crow
A distinctive sound made when a chanter reed is blown in the mouth. The crow can often give clues as to the potential performance of the reed.
Crunluath
The crunluath variation in piobaireachd consists of a series of crunluath movements played on the theme notes of the melody. The movement itself is a dramatic set of seven gracenotes which bring the tune to a climax.
Crunluath a' mach
An occasional extension of the crunluath variation, with rhythmical and melodic changes, and a slight increase in tempo, creating a spectacular finish to a piobaireachd.
Cut
(i) An old term for a single gracenote; (ii) to reduce the length of a note in a way not easily described by conventional music notation - for example, the cut note in a strathspey, normally rendered as a semiquaver, is described as cut and the resulting note is much shorter.

== D ==
Dirk
A dagger, approximately 12 inches (30 cm) long, normally only worn by Highland bagpipers in full dress.
Dithis
Piobaireachd variation. Pronounced "gee-eesh" with a glottal stop, though this depends on the speaker's accent. Literally meaning two, or a pair, it is a variation of the Urlar or theme of the Piobaireachd. Sometimes used interchangeably with the variation referred to as Siubhal, though the terms do have distinct meanings. The Dithis generally consists of a series of longer theme notes, separated by short lower notes. It is generally followed by a doubling where the long theme note is repeated, but with the same rhythmic pattern as before.
Double chanter
A chanter with two bores and two sets of finger holes. On some, both bores have the same finger hole spacing and sound in unison. On others, one bore may have only a single finger hole and is used as a sort of alternating-tone drone.
Double gold medal
Winning the two premier Highland bagpipe competitions (Oban and Inverness) in the same year. A feat only rarely achieved.
Double tone
When starting the bagpipes, as the pressure is increased, the drones initially sound at a higher pitch, perhaps a semitone or tone higher than normal. As the pressure continues to increase, the drones fully strike in at a normal and smoother pitch. This is deemed to be indicative of a higher quality reed.
Doubling
(i) Two gracenotes preceding a melody note, bracketing a short gracenote at the same pitch as the melody note (thereby doubling the melody note). (ii) A restatement of a variation in piobaireachd. Usually slightly uptempo and simpler in form.
Drone
Drone switch
A drone switch, set in a common stock, allows the player to start and stop the drones at will.
Drum major
Traditionally, a Drum Major was the senior drummer in a pipe band and commanded the band on parade, rather paradoxically without a drum. Their role was to control the band when on parade. Nowadays Drum Majors continue to fill these roles, but are not necessarily trained musicians.

== E ==
Embellishments
A common term for clusters of gracenotes which produce particular rhythmic effects.

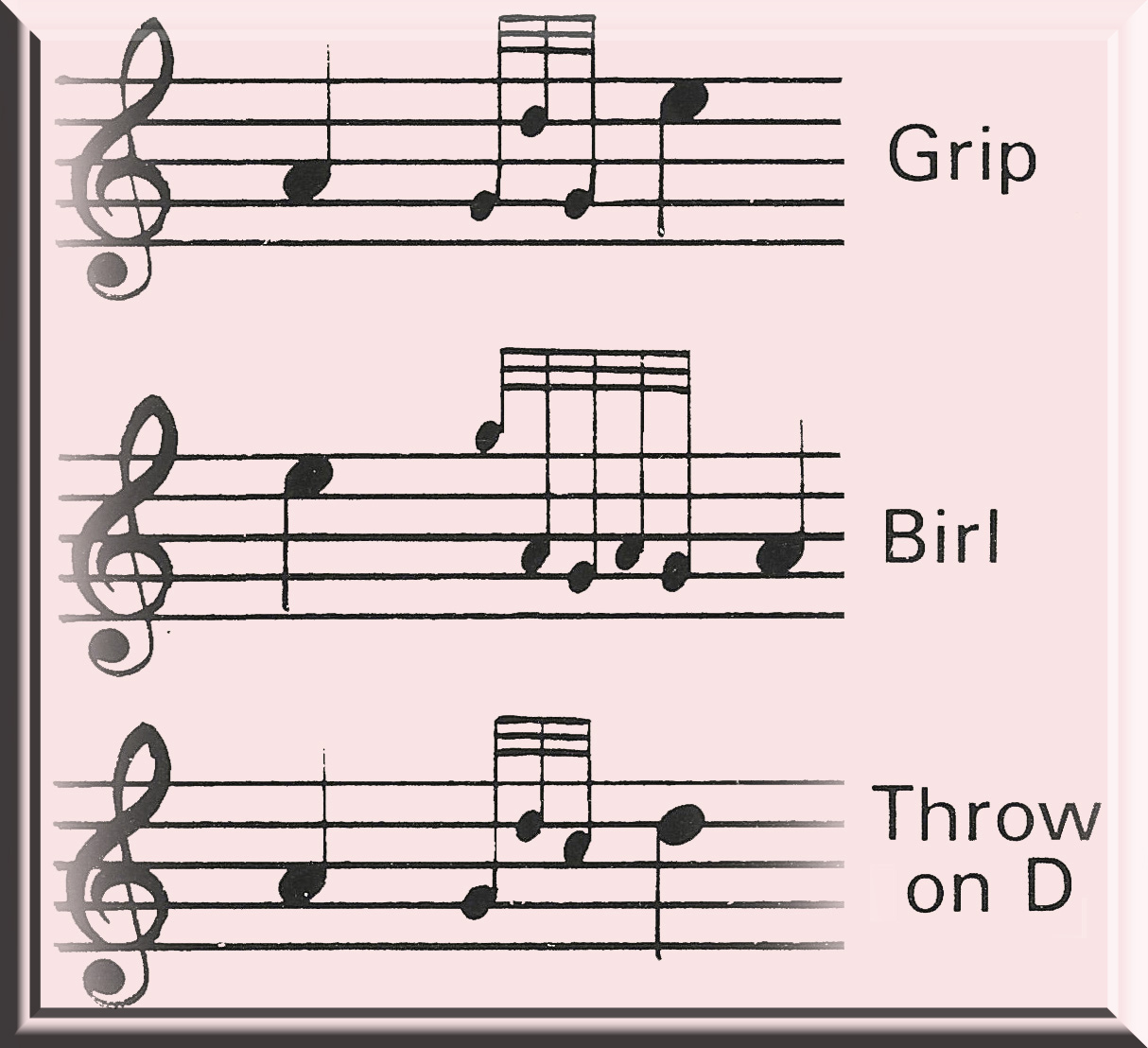
Notation: some common Highland pipe embellishments

== F ==
False notes
A recent term describing cross fingerings on the Highland bagpipe, used to create notes such as C natural that were not traditionally extant on the instrument.
False fingering
A Highland bagpipe term describing an error of fingering, typically where the player has not realised they have not lifted or replaced fingers after a particular note.
Ferrule
A band made of ivory, imitation ivory, or metal, such as brass, copper or silver, mounted around the ends of stocks, drone joints and blowpipes to be both decorative and to protect the wood from damage.
Flap valve
A device that keeps air from backing out of a blowpipe when the piper takes a breath. The valve is nothing more than a flap of leather that is mounted so as to block the airway when air pressure becomes greater on the inside than on the outside. Bellows-operated pipes usually have two flap valves, one in the air-inlet (in one of the bellows-cheeks) and the other in the connecting pipe between the bellows and the bag.
Flea hole
A very small chanter finger hole most commonly found on Eastern European and Balkan pipes that, when uncovered, raises the pitch being played by the other fingers by approximately a semitone, allowing chromatic possibilities.
Fontennelle
A rigid tubular cover that fits over the lowest key on some bagpipe chanters (notably the Italian zampogna), covering all of the keys except the very end of the actuating lever. Usually made of the same material as the chanter or the chanter's trim work.
Free hand chords
A technique on the Uilleann pipes, where the player removes their lower hand from the chanter in order to play more elaborate accompaniments than normally possible on the regulators.

== G ==
G-D-E gracenotes
On the Highland bagpipe, a frequently used gracenote sequence, appearing in every type of music. It consists of a G, D, and E gracenote on any lower note.
Grace note
Whereas in classical music a gracenote would be taken to mean a note that has melodic significance, in piping, it means a very short note, perhaps not dissimilar to the acciaccatura.
Grades
For competition purposes, pipe bands are usually organised into grades, usually from 1 to 4, with grade 1 being the highest level.
Grip
A percussive Highland bagpipe embellishment, called leamluath in Gaelic, and sometimes called a throw if used to go to a higher note, e.g. B to C or A to E.
Ground
The melody on which the variations of a piobaireachd are based. Also known as the Urlar.
Goose
A set of highland bagpipes without the drones. Used to help learners get used to the bag once they have some experience on the chanter.
Gooseneck bag
A bag with a long neck or "gooseneck" to the chanter stock. It is more comfortable for pipers with long arms.

== H ==
Half-sized pipes
A size of Highland bagpipe offered by 19th and early 20th century pipe makers. Now uncommon.
High hand
The hand playing the top of the chanter. The term is often used in the context of part of a melody which lies mostly on a single hand.
Hornpipe
Historically, the hornpipe style was developed from the dance done by sailors, played on the hornpipe instrument. In the Highland bagpiping world, the hornpipe has become a favourite style of tune for opening a competition selection and the style has evolved to become similar to a reel; portmanteaus like 'reelpipe' or 'hornreel' are sometimes used to describe these tunes.

== I ==
Imitation ivory
A synthetic replacement for elephant ivory, which has been commonly used to mount and decorate many kinds of bagpipe.

== J ==
Jig
A type of tune, in 6/8 time that is often played up-tempo to allow dancing – but jigs can be played more slowly. There are other kinds of jigs, but almost always in sets of eighth notes – so, 9/8 and 12/8 (slip jigs). In Eastern European and Baltic traditional music there are dance tunes and songs in times like 11/8 and 13/8.
Joints
Generally, the word joint refers to a complete section of a drone, rather than the actual point of connection.

== K ==
Korn-boud
Korn-boud means drone in Breton language (pl. kornioù-boud).

== L ==
Lañchenn
Lañchenn means reed in Breton language. See Te(a)od.
Lapping
The process of winding hemp (a stout thread) onto a tenon or tuning slide in order to create a good seal between the two parts.
Leumluath
(i) A (relatively unusual) piobaireachd variation. (ii) Another name for a grip movement (which is played in the leamluath variation).
Levriad
Levriad means chanter in Breton language.
Low hand
See High Hand.
Lowland bagpipe
Another name for the Border pipes. This term is generally not used nowadays due to the possibility of confusion with the Scottish Smallpipes.

== M ==
MacCrimmons
The MacCrimmon family are the traditional source of piobaireachd teaching and all players today can trace their teaching lineage back to this family. Their origin is obscure and shrouded in legend, but they were hereditary pipers to the MacLeods of Dunvegan by 1700, and were pre-eminent composers and players during the 17th and 18th centuries. Many of their tunes survive and are played today.
Mace
The drum major carries a mace to give visual signals to the band when marching.
March
A tune especially suitable for marching to. Usually an uptempo melody in 2/4, 4/4, 6/8, 9/8 or 12/8.
Massed bands
A number of pipe bands performing together, commonly after a competition or as part of a military tattoo.
Military tattoo
A signal sounded (as on a bugle or drum) shortly before Taps. Also evening entertainment given by troops usually in the form of outdoor military exercises with bagpipe music and massed bands. The annual Edinburgh Festival Tattoo is famous for its exhibition of pipe band marching and playing, including the Massed Bands finale.
Mounts
Decorative trim on the wooden parts of a bagpipe. Its function is partly protective but its main purpose is decoration.
MSR
A common abbreviation for March, Strathspey & Reel. The MSR combination has been a common one since the Victorian era and is a common competition requirement.

== N ==
Neck
The narrowest part of the chanter, just below the bole or knob.
Nicol Brown Competition
An annual piping competition in the USA founded by Pipe Major Donald Lindsay, in honour of R.U. Brown and R.B. Nicol, the two principal pupils of John MacDonald of Inverness, one of the main figures in piobaireachd tuition of the 20th century.
Northern Meeting
An annual piping competition held at Inverness, Scotland, attracting the world's top pipers. The competitive events are similar to the events held at the Argyllshire Gathering at Oban, Scotland. About 30 applicants are carefully selected to compete for the Silver Medal. Winners of the Silver can compete for the Gold. Only winners of the Gold can compete for the Clasp or Seniors medal. The Northern Meeting is traditionally considered the most senior piping competition.

== O ==
Off the knee
Playing with the Uilleann chanter removed from the leg, generally in a legato style.
On the knee
Playing the Uilleann chanter resting on the leg, generally producing a choppier, more staccato style.
Open fingering
A fingering style in Uilleann piping suited to legato playing.
Overblow
Generally, to cause a reed to jump an octave by increasing the pressure on it. Some types of bagpipe, particularly the Uilleann pipe, require this technique to achieve the full range of the chanter.

== P ==
Pib-ilin
Bretonazition of the Irish Píob(aí) Uilleann, also Binioù-Ilin.
Pib-veur
Bretonization of the Gaelic Piob-Mhor. See Binioù Bras.
Pibroch
An anglicisation, now often replaced by the Gaelic "piobaireachd".
Piob
Simply means "a pipe" in Gaelic.
Piob-mhor
Gaelic for Great Highland Bagpipe.
Piobaire
Gaelic for piper.
Piobaireachd
The most literal translation of piobaireachd is "pipering", or perhaps "what pipers do". Nowadays, it is normally taken to refer to the classical form of bagpipe music, developed by the McCrimmons in the 17th century.
Piobaireachd G
A slightly flat high G, played using a different fingering to normal, with a distinctive tone.
Píobaí uilleann
Irish Gaelic for Uilleann Pipes.
Piper's apron
See popping strap.
Piping Times
A Scottish publication dedicated to piping.
Poch-binioù
Poch-binioù means pipebag in Breton language, mainly in the Vannes dialect. See Sac'h(-binioù).
Popping
Lifting the uilleann pipe quickly off the knee for E, F♯ or G in the high octave.
Popping strap
A piece of leather, held on the uilleann piper's leg, used to achieve a good seal with the base of the chanter.
Projecting mounts
the wide mounts, usually found on the lower drone pieces, that have a decorative and protective purpose.

== Q ==
Quickstep
A tune superficially similar to, and potentially interchangeable with, a 2/4 march, suitable for a quickstep dance.

== R ==
Redundant A
Older notation for Piobaireachd includes an extra low A note in taorluaths and crunluaths. Whether or not it was played is unclear, although there are certainly players today who still play it.
Reel pipes
A miniature set of Highland bagpipes, produced in the 19th and early 20th centuries.
Regulators
A regulator is a simple chanter which is played with the heel of the hand, allowing the Uilleann piper to play a limited chordal accompaniment to the chanter melody.
Retreat
A relaxed, melodic tune in 3/4 or 9/8 time, played by highland pipers at the close of day in military barracks. It has no connection to military manoeuvring.
Roll
An embellishment used in uilleann piping, consisting of two gracenotes on the melody note. The name derives from an analogous fiddle decoration.
Rush
A wire that is inserted into the chanter. The rush effectively reduces the volume of the conical chanter below the desired hole. This causes the chanter to dampen or flatten the notes as far as the rush is inserted. Originally an actual rush was used for this purpose.

== S ==
Sac'h
Sac'h or sac'h-binioù means pipebag in Breton language. See Poch-binioù.
Scraper
A tool (knife) used to scrape reeds; the shape of the tool is critical.
Seasoning
Another name more commonly used nowadays for "dressing".
Second octave
The upper octave on the Uilleann chanter.
Seconds
A Highland bagpipe term for harmonies, usually based around parallel thirds. The effect is often intended to be textural rather than to have genuine musical merit.
Shooting board
A wood block about 6 by 2 by 1 in (152 by 51 by 25 mm) with a grove running through the long end. Used to make reeds.
Single reed
A reed with one blade, which sounds continuously through passage of air. Usually the shape of a cylinder with a tongue or flap and a bridle.
Skirl
of a bagpipe: to emit the high shrill tone of the chanter; also to give forth music; to play (music) on the bagpipe.
Sliding
Rolling a finger off a hole to create a sliding pitch change.
Soner
Soner means piper in Breton language (pl. sonerien, sonerion).
Staple
A small cylindrical piece of metal (usually copper) tubing used to support the blades of a reed.
Stop key
See Chanter Stop Key.
Strike
A gracenote played by tapping one or more fingers on the chanter.
Stouv-toul
Stouv-toul means seasoning in the Breton language (Literally "close hole")
Striking in
The process of bringing in the drones and placing the bag under the arm in a comfortable position.
Siubhal
A type of Piobaireachd variation, pronounced "shoo-al", similar to the Dithis. Consisting of a G gracenote to Low A, followed by the theme note. If the theme note is a B or C, it is accompanied by a D gracenote.
Sutell
Sutell or futell means blowpipe in Breton language.

== T ==
Tachum
The canntaireachd description of a two note figure in Highland bagpipe music. The two notes can be from C to A, or B to G, on the bottom hand. The second note is lower than the first, with a G gracenote before the first, and a D gracenote before the second.
Taorluath
A fundamental embellishment in Highland bagpipe playing, a more complex version of the GDE pattern.
Teaod, teod
Teod or teaod means reed in Breton language (literally tongue). See lañchenn.
Tenon
Connects the pipes to the stocks of a pipe. Tenons are typically wrapped with waxed thread. Cork, o-rings, and other materials are also sometimes employed for this purpose. Italian pipes use bare tapered tenons mating into tapered sockets, and screw threads carved into wood or ivory are also seen.
Tempradura
A prelude played by Spanish bagpipers as a warm-up exercise; perhaps a prelude appropriate to set the mood for the concert piece.
Throat
In a conical chanter, the narrowest part of the bore, roughly between the reed seat and the top hole. The shape of this is critical to the timbre, intonation, and performance of the chanter.
Throw on D
An embellishment on the D of the Highland bagpipe chanter not dissimilar to the grip.
Tight fingering
See closed fingering.
Tipping
A series of short staccato notes played on the Uilleann pipes.
Tongue
The vibrating element of a drone reed which has a single vibrating element. Chanter reeds have two vibrating elements or blades.
Transmontana
The bagpipe of northeastern Portugal, with one chanter with conical bore and double reed, as well as one drone with cylindrical bore and single reed.
Tuning bead
Northumbrian pipe drones incorporate a tuning bead and/or slide which allows the player to raise the pitch of the drone by a whole tone to play in other keys.
Tuning pins
Also known as tuning slides, the sections of the drone that when mated together allow the overall length to be adjusted in order to bring the drone into tune.

== U ==
Undercut
Removing material from the underneath of a finger hole to sharpen the note on the chanter without changing the shape of the hole.
Union
An early name for uilleann pipes.
Unison
In pipe bands, the term unison normally refers to how closely melody players are playing together.
Urlar
Gaelic word for Ground. See Piobaireachd above.

== V ==
Valves
Valves are used in most types of bagpipes to close off the air entry point (the blowpipe), although some pipers simply closed the end of their blowpipe when they took a breath.
Vent holes
On the Highland bagpipe chanter, the vent holes are two holes with produce low G; the reason for the term vent holes is unclear.
The Voice
The quarterly publication of the Eastern United States Pipe band Association.

== W ==
Water trap
A device attached to the blowpipe stock designed to catch moisture from the player's breath, in order to prevent the reeds from getting wet.

== Z ==
Zampogna
The bagpipe of southern Italy and Sicily, with two chanters and usually two drones in a common stock, all with conical bores with double or single reeds.

== See also ==
- Musical terminology
- Modern musical symbols
- Bagpipes
- Types of bagpipe
