= Uilleann pipes =

National bagpipe of Ireland

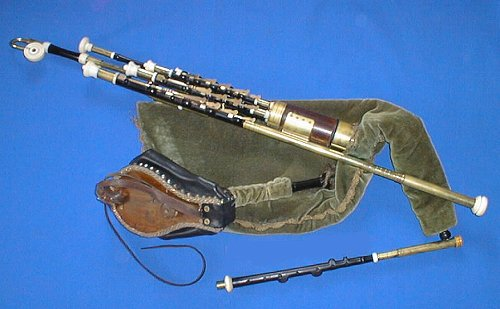

Woodwind instrument
- Other names: Union Pipes, Irish Pipes
- Classification: Aerophone; Wind; Woodwind; Bagpipe
- Hornbostel–Sachs classification: Mixed: 422.122.2 & 422.221.1 (Set of reedpipe aerophone)
- Developed: Mid 18th century to early 19th century across Ireland

Playing range
- 2 octaves

Related instruments
- Border pipes; Northumbrian pipes; Pastoral pipes; Scottish smallpipes; Galician gaita

Musicians
- List of uilleann pipers

Uilleann piping
- UNESCO Intangible Cultural Heritage
- Country: Ireland
- Reference: 01264
- Region: Europe and North America

Inscription history
- Inscription: 2017 (12th session)
- List: Representative

A half-set being played

The uilleann pipes (/ˈɪlən/ IL-ən or /ˈɪljən/ IL-yən, Irish: [ˈɪl̠ʲən̪ˠ]), also known as Union pipes and sometimes called Irish pipes, are the characteristic national bagpipe of Ireland. Their current name is a partial translation of the Irish language terms píobaí uilleann (literally, "pipes of the elbow"), from their method of inflation. There is no historical record of the name or use of the term uilleann pipes before the 20th century. The name was an invention of Grattan Flood and it stuck. People mistook the term "union" to refer to the 1800 Act of Union; however, this is incorrect as Breandán Breathnach points out that a poem published in 1796 uses the term "union".

The bag of the uilleann pipes is inflated by means of a small set of bellows strapped around the waist and the right arm (in the case of a right-handed player; in the case of a left-handed player the location and orientation of all components are reversed). The bellows not only relieve the player from the effort needed to blow into a bag to maintain pressure, they also allow relatively dry air to power the reeds, reducing the adverse effects of moisture on tuning and longevity. Some pipers can converse or sing while playing. The bag which the bellows fill is clamped under the other elbow, which squeezes the bag to control the flow of air to the reeds (which make the notes).

The air goes from the bag to the chanter, drones, and regulators. The chanter is played with the fingers like a flute. The chanter has a range of two full octaves, including some sharps and flats depending on the set (because, unlike most bagpipe chanters, it can be overblown to produce the higher octave). The chanter is often played resting on the piper's thigh, closing off the bottom hole, so that air can only escape through the open tone holes. If one tone hole is closed before the next one is opened, a staccato effect can be created, because the sound stops completely when no air can escape at all. The three drones are simple open pipes; they constantly play three notes spread an octave apart. The three regulators are closed pipes. Untouched, they do not sound, but they have keys that can be opened by the piper's wrist action (or hand, if they take one hand off the chanter). Each regulator key sounds a different note when opened. The regulator keys are aligned so that several may be pressed simultaneously. These enable the piper to play simple chords, giving rhythmic and harmonic accompaniment as needed. There are also many ornaments based on multiple or single grace notes.

The tone of the uilleann pipes is unlike that of many other forms of bagpipes. They have a different harmonic structure, sounding sweeter and quieter than many other bagpipes, such as the Great Irish warpipes, Great Highland bagpipes or the Italian zampognas. The uilleann pipes are often played indoors, and are almost always played sitting down.

== Etymology ==
Uilleann is a genitive form of the Irish word for "elbow”, uillinn. The Irish term for uilleann pipes is píb uilleann (alt. píob uilleann), which means "pipes(s) of the elbow(s)”.

However, the first attested written form is "Union pipes", at the end of the 18th century, perhaps to denote the union of the chanter, drones, and regulators. Another theory is that it was played throughout a prototypical full union of England, Wales, Ireland and Scotland. This is definitely untrue, because this name for the instrument predates the Act of Union, which took effect in 1801. Alternatively, the uilleann pipes were certainly a favourite of the upper classes in Scotland, Ireland and the North-East of England and were fashionable for a time in formal social settings, where the term Union pipes may also originate.

The term "uilleann pipes" is first attested at the beginning of the 20th century. William Henry Grattan Flood, an Irish music scholar, proposed the theory that the name "uilleann" came from the Irish word for "elbow". He cited to this effect William Shakespeare's play The Merchant of Venice published in 1600 (Act IV, sc. I, l. 55) where the expression "woollen pipes" appears. This theory originated in correspondence between two earlier antiquarians, and was adopted as gospel by the Gaelic League. The use of uilleann was perhaps also a rebellion against the term union, with its connotations of the Act of Union. It was however shown by Breandán Breathnach that it would be difficult to explain the anglicization of the word uilleann into 'woollen' before the 16th century (when the instrument did not exist as such) and then its adaptation as 'union' two centuries later.

== History ==
The first bagpipes to be well attested for Ireland were similar, if not identical, to the Scottish Highland bagpipes that are now played in Scotland. These are known as the "Great Irish Warpipes". In Irish and Scottish Gaelic, this instrument was called the píob mhór ("great pipe").

While the mouth-blown warpipe was alive and well upon the battlefields of France and other parts of Europe, it had almost disappeared in Ireland. The union or uilleann pipe emerged during the early 18th century around the same time as the development of the bellows-driven Northumbrian smallpipes and the bellows-driven Scottish Lowland bagpipes. All three instruments were far quieter and sweeter in tone than their mouth-blown predecessors. Essentially their design required the joining of a bellows under the right arm, which pumped air via a tube to a leather bag under the left arm, which in turn supplied air at a constant pressure to the chanter and the drones (and regulators in the case of the Irish Uilleann pipes). Geoghegan's tutor of the 1740s calls this early form of the uilleann pipes the "Pastoral or New bagpipe". The Pastoral pipes were bellows blown and played in either a seated or standing position. The conical bored chanter was played "open", that is, legato, unlike the uilleann pipes, which can also be played "closed", that is, staccato. The early Pastoral pipes had two drones, and later examples had one (or rarely, two) regulator(s). The Pastoral and later flat set Union pipes developed with ideas on the instrument being traded back-and-forth between Ireland, Scotland and England, around the 18th and early 19th centuries.

The earliest surviving sets of uilleann pipes date from the second half of the 18th century, but it must be said that datings are not definitive. Only recently has scientific attention begun to be paid to the instrument, and problems relating to various stages of its development have yet to be resolved. The Uilleann pipes or union pipes might have originated from the Pastoral pipes (Border pipes, Northumbrian pipes, Scottish smallpipes) and gained popularity in Ireland within the Protestant Anglo-Irish community and its gentlemen pipers, who could afford such expensive hand-made instruments. The Irish uilleann pipes are far more elaborate in their design, and their development is likely to have occurred among the well-to-do. Certainly many of the early players in Ireland were Protestant, possibly the best known being the mid-18th-century piper Jackson from Co Limerick and the 18th-century Tandragee blind pipemaker William Kennedy. The famous Rowsome family from Co. Wexford were also Church of Ireland until the mid-late 19th century. The Uilleann pipes were often used by the Protestant clergy, who employed them as an alternative to the church organ. As late as the 19th century the instrument was still commonly associated with the Anglo-Irish, e.g. the Anglican clergyman Canon James Goodman (1828–1896) from Kerry, who had his tailor-made uilleann pipes buried with him at Creagh (Church of Ireland) cemetery near Baltimore, County Cork. His friend, and Trinity College colleague, John Hingston from Skibbereen also played the uilleann pipes. Another piping friend of Canon Goodman, Alderman Phair of Cork (founder of the pipers club in Cork in the 1890s) had Goodman's pipes recovered from Creagh cemetery. They were later donated to Cork piper Michael O'Riabhaigh, who had re-established the (by then extinct) pipers club in Cork in the 1960s.

== Tuning ==
The instrument is usually (nowadays) tuned in the key of D, a tradition begun by the Taylor brothers (originally of Drogheda, Ireland, and later of Philadelphia, Pennsylvania) in the late 19th century. Canon Goodman played a Taylor set. Up to then, most pipes were what would be termed as "flat sets" in other keys, such as D♭, C, B and B♭, tunings which were largely incompatible with playing with other instruments. The chanter length determines the overall tuning; accompanying pieces of the instrument, such as drones and regulators, are tuned to the same key as the chanter. Chanters of around 362 mm (14 1/4 in) in length produce a bottom note on or near D_{4} (D above middle C) where A_{4} = 440 Hz, i.e. modern "concert pitch". Such pipes are a relatively recent invention pioneered by the Taylor brothers. They typically have wider bores and larger tone holes than the earlier "flat" pitch sets, and as a consequence are a good deal louder, though by no means as loud as the Highland pipes of Scotland. They were developed by the Taylors to meet the requirements of playing in larger venues in the United States; today they are the most common type of uilleann pipes encountered, though many players still prefer the mellower sound of the earlier style narrow-bore pipes, which exist in pitches ranging from D through D♭, C, and B down to B♭. Pipemakers before the Taylors had, however, built concert pitch pipes using the narrower bores and smaller fingerholes of the flat pipes. Some of these instruments seem to have been designed with lower pitch standards in mind, such as A_{4} = 415 Hz. The Taylors also built many instruments with higher pitch standards in mind, such as the Old Philharmonic pitch of A_{4} = 453 Hz that was commonplace in late 19th-century America.

The D pipes are most commonly used in ensembles, while the flat-pitched pipes are more often used for solo playing – often fiddlers will tune down their instrument to play with a piper's flat set, but the inflexibility of other instruments used in Irish music (accordions, flutes, etc.) does not usually permit this. It is noteworthy that Irish music was predominantly solo music until the late 19th century, when these fixed-pitch instruments began to play more of a role. Like some older pipe organs, uilleann pipes are not normally tuned to even temperament, but rather to just intonation, so that the chanter and regulators can blend sweetly with the three drones. Equal temperament is almost universal with the fixed pitch instruments used in Irish music, which can clash with the tuning of the pipes.

== Instrument variations ==
A full set of uilleann pipes includes a chanter, drones, and regulators. A half-set lacks the regulators, and a practice set lacks both regulators and drones. All three are used in professional performance.

=== Practice set ===
Because of the instrument's complexity, beginning uilleann pipers often start out with partial sets known as practice sets.

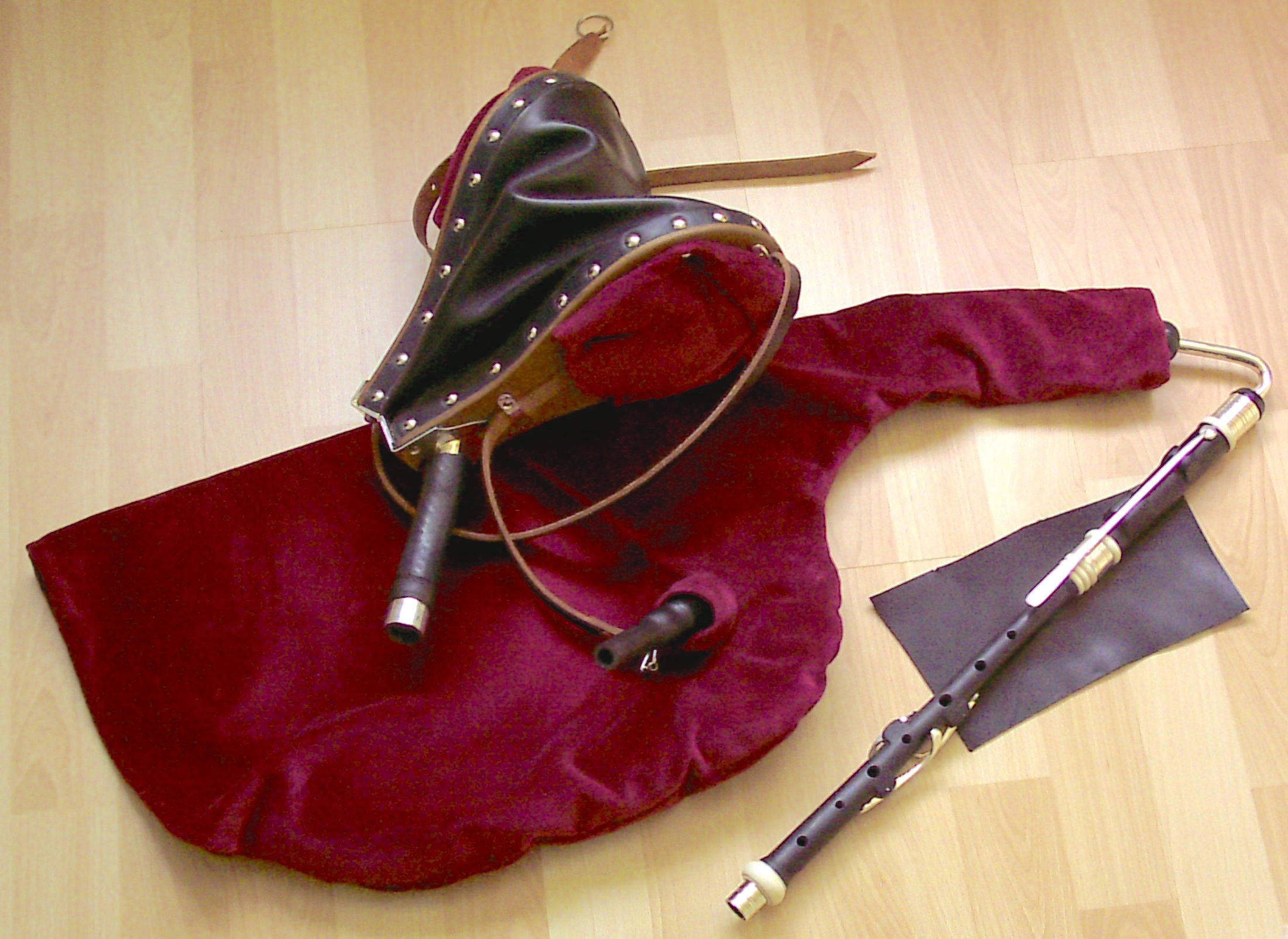
Starter or practice set

A practice set consists of only the basic elements of pipe bag, bellows and chanter, with no drones or regulators. The chanter is available in keys ranging from the "concert pitch" D chanter in half-note steps downward to a B♭ chanter, the latter being regularly referred to as a "flat set" (as are any sets below the key of D).

To play the uilleann pipes effectively, students must learn to pump the bellows steadily while controlling the pressure on the bag and playing the chanter simultaneously. So beginners often play on practice sets until they become comfortable with those basic mechanics. Despite their name, however, practice sets are used not only by beginning players but also by some advanced players when they wish to play just the chanter with other musicians, either live or in recording sessions. In these instances, the practice sets can be tuned to equal temperament if needed.

=== Half set ===
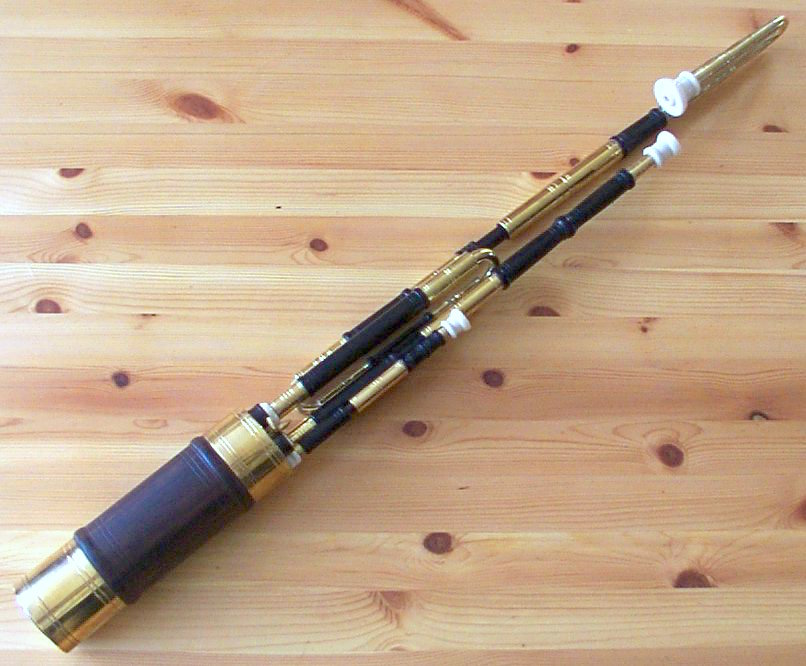
Uilleann pipes drones

A half set is the next stage up from a practice set. As with other forms of bagpipes, uilleann pipes use "drones", which are most commonly three pipes accompanying the melody of the chanter with a constant background tonic note. The pipes are generally equipped with three drones: the tenor drone, as the highest sounding pipe, which is pitched the same as the lowest note of the chanter; the baritone drone pitched one octave below that; and the bass drone, as the lowest sounding pipe, two octaves below the bottom note of the chanter. The Pastoral pipes had four drones: these three plus one more that would play a harmony note at the fourth or fifth interval. These drones are connected to the pipe bag by a "stock". This is an intricately made wooden cylinder tied into the bag (as any other stock) by a thick yarn or hemp thread. The drones connect to the stock, as do the regulators (see full set below). The stock and drones are laid across the right thigh. This is distinct from other forms of bagpipes, in which the drones are usually carried over the shoulder or over the right arm.

The drones can be switched off. This is made possible by a key connected to the stock. The original design of the stock was a hollow cylinder, with two metal tubes running through it to both hold the regulators and independently supply air to them. Thus the regulators could be played with the drones silenced. In the late 19th century it became more common to build the stock from a solid piece of wood, with five holes bored through it end-to-end. This was less susceptible to damage than the earlier design. The piper is also able to switch on and off various drones individually (applying slightly more pressure to the bag and tapping the end of a drone), which is generally used to aid in tuning (a technique used in almost all bagpipes that have drones) or all of them at the same time using this key. This makes the instrument more versatile and usable not only as a half set, but also to allow playing the chanter by itself. The drones use a single-bladed reed (the actual part creating sound), unlike the double reed used in the chanter and the regulators. These drone reeds were generally made from elderberry twigs in the past, while cane began to be used in the late 19th century.

=== Full set ===
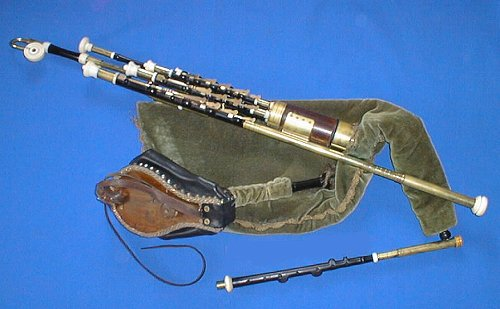
Full set

A full set, as the name implies, is a complete set of uilleann pipes. This would be a half set with the addition of three regulators. These are three closed pipes, similar to the chanter, held in the stock. Like the drones, they are usually given the terms tenor, baritone, and bass, from smallest to largest. A regulator uses keys (five on the tenor and four on both baritone and bass) to accompany the melody of the chanter; these keys are arranged in rows to give limited two-note "chords" or, alternatively, single notes for emphasis on phrases or specific notes. The notes of the regulators, from highest to lowest (given a nominal pitch of D) are as follows: tenor: C, B, A, G, F♯; baritone: A, G, F♯, D; bass: C, B, A, G. The tenor and baritone regulators fit into the front face of the stock, on top of the drones; the bass regulator is attached to the side of the stock (furthest from the piper), and is of complex construction.

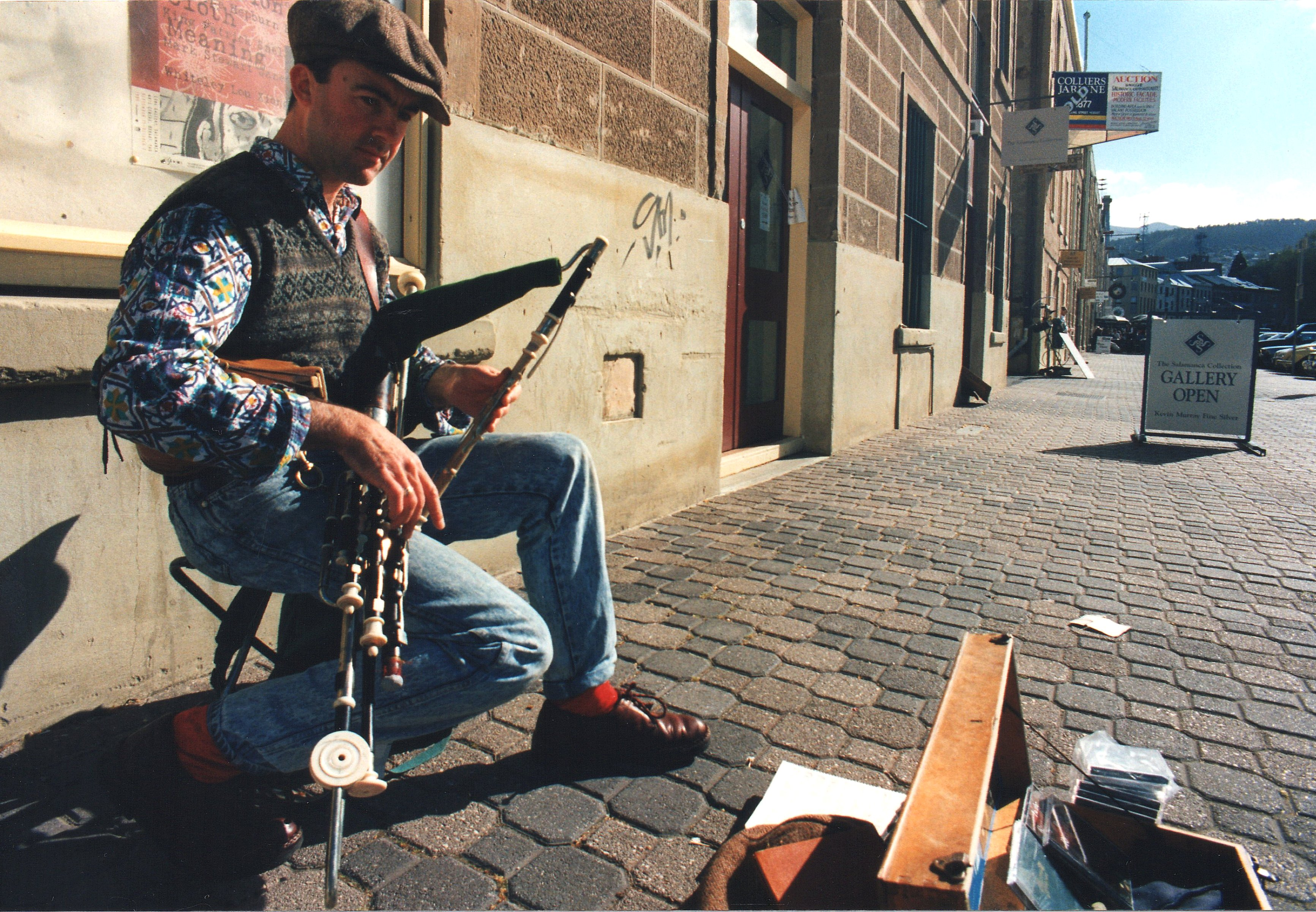
Richard "Dicky" Deegan, piper, busking with his full set in Salamanca Place, Hobart, Tasmania, Australia in 1995

Another method of using the regulators is to play what are referred to as "hand chords": when the melody (usually in a slower piece of music such as an air) is being played on the chanter exclusively with the left hand, the right hand will be free to create more complex chords, using all three regulators at once if so desired. Many airs end a section on a G or A in the first octave, at which point a piper will often play one of these hand chords for dramatic effect.

=== Chanter ===
The chanter is the part of the uilleann pipes that is used to play the melody. It has eight finger holes (example given of a D pitched chanter): bottom D, E♭, E, F♯, G, A, B, C, C♯, high D (also called "back D"). To achieve the bottom D (D_{4}) the chanter is lifted off the knee, exposing the exit of the chanter's bore, where the note is produced. The chanter is set on the right knee thus closing off the bottom hole. Many players use a strip of leather placed over the knee, called a "popping strap", which provides for an airtight seal. More rarely, a simple gravity- or spring-operated flap valve attached to the bottom of the chanter achieves the same end. Generally, for all other notes (except for special effects, or to vary the volume and tone) the chanter stays on the knee.

One characteristic of the chanter is that it can produce staccato notes, because the piper seals it off at the bottom; with all of the finger holes closed, the chanter is silenced. This is also necessary for obtaining the second octave; the chanter must be closed and the bag pressure increased, and then fingered notes will sound in the second octave. A great range of different timbres can be achieved by varying the fingering of notes and also raising the chanter off the knee, which gives the uilleann pipes a degree of dynamic range not found in other forms of bagpipes. Pipers who use staccato fingering often are termed "closed-style" pipers. Those who use legato fingering more predominately are referred to as "open-style" pipers. Open piping has historical associations with musicians (often Irish travelling people) who played on the street or outdoors, since the open fingering is somewhat louder, especially with the chanter played off the knee (which can, however, lead to faulty pitch with the second octave notes).

A type of simultaneous vibrato and tremolo can be achieved by tapping a finger below the open note hole on the chanter. The bottom note also has two different "modes", namely the "soft D" and the "hard D". The hard bottom D sounds louder and more strident than the soft D and is accomplished by applying slightly more pressure to the bag and flicking a higher note finger as it is sounded. Pipemakers tune the chanter so the hard D is the in-tune note, the soft D usually being slightly flat.

Many chanters are fitted with keys to allow accurate playing of all the semitones of the scale. Four keys will give all the semitones: F♮, G♯, B♭, C♮. Older chanters usually had another key for producing D_{6} (D in the third octave), and often another small key for E_{6}, and another for D♯_{5} (as opposed to the E♭ fingerhole, which could be slightly off-pitch). Most uilleann chanters are very responsive to "half-holing" or "sliding", which is the practice of obtaining a note by leaving a fingerhole only half-covered. This is why many chanters sold in Ireland are sold without keys. With this technique and some practice, many pipers can accurately play the semitones which would otherwise require a chromatic key to be installed. The exception to this is the C_{6} (C♮ in the second octave), which cannot be cross-fingered or half-holed, and requires the key. This is the most commonly fitted key.

The chanter uses a double reed, similar to that of the oboe or bassoon. Unlike most reed instruments, the uilleann pipe reed must be crafted so that it can play two full octaves accurately, without the fine tuning allowed by the use of a player's lips; only bag pressure and fingering patterns can be used to maintain the correct pitch of each note. It is for this reason that making uilleann-pipe chanter reeds is a demanding task. Uilleann pipe reeds are also often called "the piper's despair" for the immense difficulty of maintaining, tuning and especially making the double reed of the regulators and, most importantly, the chanter.

== Notable players ==
- Willie Clancy (1918–1973)
- Troy Donockley (born 1964) of Nightwish.
- Johnny Doran (c. 1908–1950)
- Séamus Ennis (1919–1982)
- Finbar Furey (born 1946)
- Thomas Garoghan (1849–1922)
- Paddy Keenan (1950–2026)
- Declan Masterson
- Michael McGoldrick (born 1971)
- Paddy Moloney (1938–2021) of the Chieftains.
- Liam O'Flynn (1945–2018) of Planxty
- Leo Rowsome (1903–1970)
- Davy Spillane (born 1959)
- William Talbot (1792-1874)

== See also ==
- Types of bagpipes
- List of All Ireland Uilleann pipe champions
- List of bagpipers
- Glossary of bagpipe terms
