= Pastoral pipes =

Musical instrument

Pastoral Pipes
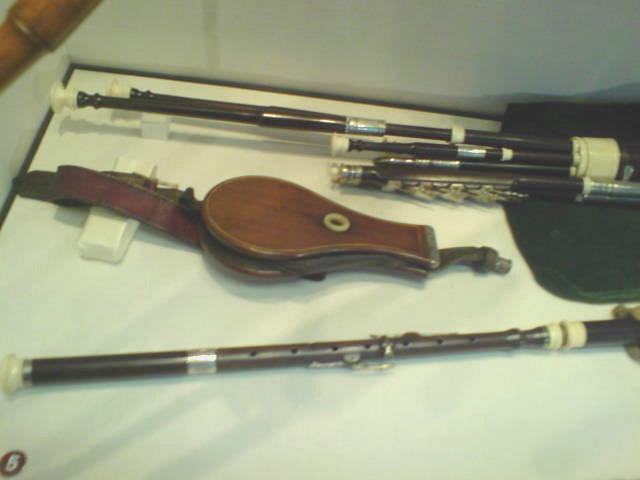
- Other names: Union pipes
- Classification: Aerophone; Wind; Woodwind; Bagpipe

Playing range
- 2 octaves

Related instruments
- Border pipes; Northumbrian pipes; Uilleann pipes; Scottish smallpipes

The pastoral pipe (also known as the hybrid union pipes, organ pipe and union pipe) was a bellows-blown bagpipe, widely recognised as the forerunner and ancestor of the 19th-century union pipes, which became the uilleann pipes of today. Similar in design and construction, it had a foot joint in order to play a low leading note and plays a two octave chromatic scale. There is a tutor for the "Pastoral or New Bagpipe" by J. Geoghegan, published in London in 1745. It had been considered that Geoghegan had overstated the capabilities of the instrument, but a study on surviving instruments has shown that it did indeed have the range and chromatic possibilities which he claimed.

== History ==
This bagpipe was commonly played in the Lowlands of Scotland, Northern England and Ireland from the mid-18th until the early 20th century. It was a precursor of what are now known as uilleann pipes, and there were several well-known makers over a large geographic area, including London, Edinburgh, Aberdeen, Dublin, and Newcastle upon Tyne. Therefore, it is difficult to say which country the pastoral pipe and its later adapted union pipe specifically come from, although the earliest known piping tunebook — "Geoghegan's Compleat Tutor" — refers to a maker in London in 1746. As the pastoral pipe was modified it developed into the union pipe in the period 1770–1830; makers in all three countries contributed ideas and design improvements. Both pipes were played by gentlemen pipers of the period in Scotland, England and the Anglo-Irish Protestants in Ireland, people in society who could afford an expensive hand made set of pipes.

The term “new bagpipe” refers to the expanded compass and improvements to the instrument. Although the term "pastoral" is not historically found outside Geoghegan's London context, it is evocative of a style of music played at the time. Originally the label “pastoral” may refer to the “ancient pastoral airs" played on the instrument composed in a "gentle, very sweet, easy manner in the immolation of those airs which Shepard’s are supposed to play". This style would suit the sweet tone of the pastoral pipes union/uilleann pipes of the late 18th century, when literature, art and music romanticized rural life. In the 19th century oboes were being marketed in London as “pastoral” to fit the music styles of the times. The pastoral bagpipe may have been the invention of an expert instrument maker who was aiming at the Romantic market. The pastoral pipes, and later union pipes, were certainly a favourite of the upper classes in Scotland, Ireland and the North-East of England and were fashionable for a time in formal social settings, where the term "union pipes" may originate.

The first reference to a pastoral pipe comes from popular and fashionable pastoral dramas of the time with music such as the Gentle Shepherd in 1725 by the writer and poet Allan Ramsay, and the English Ballad The Beggar’s Opera in 1728, as a counter-measure against the influx of Pastoral Italian music. The opera featured an “en masse” dance led by a pastoral pipe and the scene was engraved by William Hogarth (1697–1764) who clearly shows a bellows blown bagpipe similar to the one later depicted in the Geoghegan tutor. The Geoghegan repertoire draws on contemporary compositions namely the London organist John Ravenwood (1745), composer John Grey (1745), the musical collection of William Thomson's Orpheus Caledonius in 1733, as well as operatic arrangements for the Ossian cycle. The pastoral pipes were regarded in a classical or neo-baroque setting, played by gentlemen pipers and spread across the upper circles of polite society as the instrument of choice. An established bellows pipes with an extended range is noted to be played across Scotland no later than 1760 in the “Complete Theory of the Great Highland bagpipe” by Joseph MacDonald.

Lovers of Ossian felt a kind of enthusiastic rapture when they beheld the guests seated, and the bards arranged in the flower-decked hall of Fingal; when they heard the sweet harmony of the harps (clarsach) and the Union pipes and the song of the bards they heard also the warlike sound of the shield of the hall of Fingal.

—Oscar and Malvina

An engraving of Billy Purvis (1784–1853) one of the last travelling minstrel pipers of the south of Scotland and the North East of England. Playing a union pipe early-19th century.

The first reference to the instrument in Ireland is provided by John O'Keefe in 1760 as an instrument of polite society and the emerging pastoral and prototype union pipe influenced the folk tradition of the 18th and 19th century in Scotland and Ireland. This can be thought of as a shared tradition which served a neo-baroque orchestral and concert fashion but also drew strongly on the ‘native traditions’ of both Scotland and Ireland and the music styles of the times.

The pastoral pipes can be played either standing or in a seated position using a set of bellows, and the chanter is similar to the later union pipes, but it had an added foot joint that extended its range one tone lower. This added foot joint had holes in its sides in addition to the hole at the bottom of the bore. The pastoral pipes are like the Highland pipes in that the sound is continuous; notes are articulated by finger techniques such as gracenotes. The union pipes, which evolved from the pastoral pipes, enable the player to interrupt the flow of air by stopping the end of the chanter on his knee; this doesn't work for the pastoral instrument because of the side tone holes. Many later pastoral sets, though, have a dismountable foot joint; when this is removed they can be played as union pipes. The surviving instruments indicate that the pastoral pipes had two or three drones and generally one regulator.

== Tuning ==
The conventional view was that the pastoral pipes were difficult to shift between the lower and upper registers. Recent reconstructions and refurbishments have shown that this is not the case. In modern Uilleann pipes, the player will move from the lower to the upper register by stopping the chanter momentarily while increasing the bag pressure, causing the reed to double-tone. However, in the pastoral pipe, the same effect can be achieved by increasing the bag pressure while playing a suitable gracenote. For example, to go from first octave A to second octave A the player can use an E gracenote. Surviving Pastoral pipe manuscripts have many tunes that leap vigorously between registers. The ability to stop the chanter does help, though; it also gives the instrument much better dynamics, as the chanter can be raised and lowered from the knee to modulate the volume. This may have motivated the evolution into the union pipe by removing the foot joint from the pastoral pipes.

The pastoral pipe had a narrow throat bore of 3.5–4 mm and an exit bore seldom larger than 11 mm. Its bore was very similar to later flat set Union pipe chanter bores made in the early 18th century. The reeds had a head width of 9.5–10.5 mm and staple bores of 3.6 mm. The chanters were made in a variety of pitches with a quiet tone and an E flat pitch being very common among surviving instruments. Later examples include a slide on the foot joint to change the lower leading note from flat to sharp as required and on a further set an on/off mechanism is fitted to control the drones with the two regulators fitted neatly to the top of the common stock and the addition of key in "e" to increase the compass of the chanter in the second octave.

== Chanter ==
The Pastoral chanter is used to play the melody and is similar to later flat set union pipe chanters in tone. It has eight finger holes giving middle C, D, E, F♯, G, A, B, C or C♯, D' using open fingering in the first register. Most of the accidentals can be obtained by cross-fingering and a second register is available by increasing the bag pressure. With a suitable reed, a few third-octave notes can also be played. Later sets included fully chromatic chanters using as many as seven keys. The chanter uses a complex double-bladed reed, similar to that of the oboe or bassoon. This must be crafted so that it can play two full octaves accurately, without the fine tuning allowed by the use of a player's lips; only bag pressure and fingering can be used to maintain the correct pitch of each note.

== Removal of the footjoint ==
The Pastoral pipes gradually evolved into the union pipes as baroque musical tastes favoured a more expressive type of instrument. The foot joint may have fallen out of use as early as the 1746–1770s as oboists of the period, who usually played pastoral pipes, would frequently remove or invert the foot joint in order to remove the low C# foot joint to play the chanter upon the knee. The fall from grace of the open chanter was slow to take effect as pastoral pipes with removable foot joints were still being made till the 1850s and played until after the First World War. In time the instrument would be tuned for performance on the knee rather than off it, and the foot joint remnant today is the tenon cut around the foot of the modern uilleann chanter.

== Instrument makers of the pastoral and Union pipes ==
Union pipes early-19th century ebony, ivory and silver mounts with two regulators with a keyed D-Chanter; by the pipe maker Robert Reid of Newcastle-upon-Tyne.

Some of the oldest surviving instruments date from the 1770–1790s, notably James Kenna of Mullingar, Hugh Robertson of Edinburgh and later Robert Reid of North Shields. Pipemakers started to optimise the instrument for performance on the knee rather than off it, so that players could take advantage of the better dynamics this offered. It is possible that the performer community diverged for a while into union pipers playing without the foot joint, and old-style pastoral pipers who retained it and could play in both styles. In any case, both "long" and "short” pastoral/union chanters were documented in both Scotland and Ireland until around World War One. The evolution of the union and uilleann (a term originating in 1904 by Irish nationalists) pipes was also driven by competition between makes; throughout the late 18th and early 19th century, pipemakers in Aberdeen, Dublin, Edinburgh and Newcastle competed and copied each other's ideas and innovations.

== Instrument variations ==
Historical examples of various designs have turned up over a wide geographical area, and several pipemakers have offered reconstructions. They are not widely played, though research and interest in them is currently increasing.
