= The Bagpipe Society =

The Bagpipe Society is an organisation based in the United Kingdom which aims to bring together players of, makers of, researchers of and lovers of the bagpipes.

== Notes ==
Formed in 1986, the Society promotes the revival of interest in bagpipes in Britain and around the world. The Bagpipe Society publishes Chanter, a quarterly journal which contains articles about the bagpipe's history, music and playing as well as various reviews. The society holds an annual gathering in England called the Blowout, and with the International Bagpipe Organization, helps to coordinate the International Bagpipe Day, held annually on March 10. On that day, the Bagpipe Society encourages everyone to play their pipes at noon local time, and then post a photograph or video on their Facebook page.
